= List of statutory instruments of the United Kingdom, 1988 =

This is a complete list of all 1,558 statutory instruments published in the United Kingdom in the year 1988.

== Statutory instruments ==
=== 1-499 ===
==== 1–100 ====
- Origin of Goods (Petroleum Products) Regulations 1988 (SI 1988/1)
- Export of Sheep (Prohibition) (No.2) Amendment Order 1988 (SI 1988/6)
- Food Protection (Emergency Prohibitions) (England) Amendment Order 1988 (SI 1988/7)
- National Health Service (Charges to Overseas Visitors) Amendment Regulations 1988 (SI 1988/8)
- Food Protection (Emergency Prohibitions) (Wales) (No.5) Amendment Order 1988 (SI 1988/9)
- Housing (Improvement of Amenities of Residential Areas) (Scotland) Order 1988 (SI 1988/10)
- Food Protection (Emergency Prohibitions) Order 1988 Approved by both Houses of Parliament (SI 1988/11)
- National Health Service (Charges to Overseas Visitors) (Scotland) Amendment Regulations 1988 (SI 1988/13)
- Amusements with Prizes (Variation of Fees) Order 1988 (SI 1988/14)
- Gaming Act (Variation of Fees) Order 1988 (SI 1988/15)
- A40 London—Fishguard Trunk Road (Long Lane Junction Improvement Trunk Road and Slip Roads) Order 1988 (SI 1988/18)
- Local Government (Rate Product) (Scotland) Amendment Regulations 1988 (SI 1988/19)
- Highland Regional Council (Abhainn Shlatach) Water Order 1988 (SI 1988/20)
- Highland Regional Council (Loch an t-Seana Bhaile) (Amendment) Water Order 1988 (SI 1988/21)
- Building Societies (Designated Capital Resources) Order 1988 (SI 1988/22)
- Building Societies (Designation of Relevant Estate Agencies) Order 1988 (SI 1988/23)
- Gipsy Encampments (The Borough of North Bedfordshire and the District of Mid Bedfordshire) Order 1988 (SI 1988/26)
- Assured Tenancies (Approved Bodies) (No.1) Order 1988 (SI 1988/28)
- Diplomatic and Consular Premises (Cambodia) Order 1988 (SI 1988/30)
- Fire Services (Appointments and Promotion) (Amendment) Regulations 1988 (SI 1988/31)
- Common Parts Grant (Rateable Value Limits) Order 1988 (SI 1988/32)
- Grants by Local Housing Authorities (Appropriate Percentage and Exchequer Contributions) Order 1988 SI 1988/33)
- Social Fund (Application for Review) Regulations 1988 (SI 1988/34)
- Social Fund (Recovery by Deductions from Benefits) Regulations 1988 (SI 1988/35)
- Social Fund Maternity and Funeral Expenses (General) Amendment Regulations 1988 (SI 1988/36)
- British Film Fund Agency (Dissolution) Order 1988 (SI 1988/37)
- Fishing Vessels (Life-Saving Appliances) Regulations 1988 (SI 1988/38)
- M40 London-Oxford-Birmingham Motorway (Waterstock to Warwick Section) and Connecting Roads (No. 1) Scheme 1984 Variation (No. 2) Scheme 1988 (SI 1988/39)
- A46 (Coventry Eastern Bypass Slip Roads) Order 1988 (SI 1988/40)
- Financial Services Act 1986 (Occupational Pension Schemes) Order 1988 (SI 1988/41)
- Anatomy Regulations 1988 (SI 1988/44)
- Disposal of Waste (Control of Beet Rhizomania Disease) Order 1988 (SI 1988/45)
- Thames Water Authority (Repeal of Local Enactments) Order 1988 (SI 1988/46)
- Wireless Telegraphy (Content of Transmission) Regulations 1988 (SI 1988/47)
- City of Edinburgh and East Lothian Districts (Newhailes) Boundaries Amendment Order 1988 (SI 1988/48) (S. 6)
- East Lothian and Midlothian Districts (Marldene) Boundaries Amendment Order 1988 (SI 1988/49) (S. 7)
- Kirkcaldy and Dunfermline Districts (Ballingry) Boundaries Amendment Order 1988 (SI 1988/50) (S. 8)
- Disabled Persons (Services, Consultation and Representation) Act 1986 (Commencement No. 4) Order 1988 (SI 1988/51)
- Newcastle and Gateshead Water Order 1988 (SI 1988/56)
- A20 Trunk Road (Sidcup Bypass, Bexley and Bromley) (Speed Limits) Order 1988 (SI 1988/57)
- Nottinghamshire (District Boundaries) Order 1988 (SI 1988/61)
- King's Lynn and West Norfolk District (Parishes) Order 1988 (SI 1988/62)
- (A1) London—Edinburgh—Thurso Trunk Road (Newcastle Western Bypass and Slip Roads) Order 1986 (Variation) Order 1988 (SI 1988/64)
- Inner London Education Area (Electoral Arrangements) Order 1988 (SI 1988/65)
- Local Government (Miscellaneous Provisions) Act 1982 (Repeal of Local Acts) Order 1988 (SI 1988/66)
- Channel Tunnel Act (Competition) Order 1988 (SI 1988/67)
- Channel Tunnel Act (Competition) (No. 2) Order 1988 (SI 1988/68)
- Reservoirs Act 1975 (Application Fees) (Amendment) Regulations 1988 (SI 1988/69)
- Cheshire (District Boundaries) Order 1988 (SI 1988/70)
- Derbyshire (District Boundaries) Order 1988 (SI 1988/71)
- Cowes Harbour Revision Order 1988 (SI 1988/72)
- (A174) Parkway Interchange to ICI Westgate Roundabout (Trunking) Order 1988 (SI 1988/73)
- Sea Fishing (Enforcement of Community Conservation Measures) (Amendment) Order 1988 (SI 1988/77)
- North West Water Authority (Wilmslow and Alderley Edge) Order 1988 (SI 1988/78)
- South West Water Authority (River Wolf Discharge) Order 1988 (SI 1988/79)
- Registration of Births, Deaths, Marriages and Divorces (Fees) (Scotland) Regulations 1988 (SI 1988/80)
- Anatomy Act 1984 (Commencement) Order 1988 (SI 1988/81)
- Home Purchase Assistance (Recognised Lending Institutions) (No. 1) Order 1988 (SI 1988/84)
- Housing (Right to Buy) (Priority of Charges) (No. 1) Order 1988 (SI 1988/85)
- Mortgage Indemnities (Recognised Bodies) (No. 1) Order 1988 (SI 1988/87)
- Double Taxation Relief (Taxes on Income) (Foreign Loan Interest) Regulations 1988 (SI 1988/88)
- Prison (Amendment) Rules 1988 (SI 1988/89)
- Industrial Training Levy (Construction Board) Order 1988 (SI 1988/90)
- Department of Trade and Industry (Fees) Order 1988 (SI 1988/93)
- Disabled Persons (Services, Consultation and Representation) Act 1986 (Commencement No. 5) (Scotland) Order 1988 (SI 1988/94)
- Insolvency Fees (Amendment) Order 1988 (SI 1988/95)
- Cardiff-Glan Conwy Trunk Road A470 (Llanidloes By-pass) Order 1988 (SI 1988/96)
- Sex Discrimination Act 1986 (Commencement No. 2) Order 1988 (SI 1988/99)

=== 101–200 ===
- A4 Trunk Road (Bath Road, Hounslow) (Prescribed Routes) Order 1988 (SI 1988/103)
- A3 Trunk Road (Wandsworth Common North Side, Wandsworth) (Box Junction) Order 1988 (SI 1988/104)
- A41 Trunk Road (Watford Way, Barnet) (Prescribed Routes) Order 1988 (SI 1988/105)
- Diplomatic and Consular Premises Act 1987 (Commencement No. 3) Order 1988 (SI 1988/106)
- Education (Publication and Consultation Etc.) (Scotland) Amendment Regulations 1988 (SI 1988/107)
- Amusements with Prizes (Variation of Fees) (Scotland) Order 1988 (SI 1988/108)
- Gaming Act (Variation of Fees) (Scotland) Order 1988 (SI 1988/109)
- Act of Adjournal (Consolidation) 1988 (SI 1988/110)
- Harrogate (Parishes) Order 1988 (SI 1988/111)
- Northavon (Parishes) Order 1988 (SI 1988/112)
- Canterbury (Parish of Chestfield) Order 1988 (SI 1988/113)
- Revaluation Rate Rebates (Scotland) Order 1987 (SI 1988/114)
- AIDS (Control) (Contents of Reports) Order 1988 (SI 1988/117)
- Capacity Serving Measures (Intoxicating Liquor) Regulations 1988 (SI 1988/120)
- East of Birmingham/Birkenhead Trunk Road (A41 Improvement at Chester and Slip Roads) Order 1988 (SI 1988/121)
- M53 Motorway (Southern Terminal Roundabout Section) Scheme 1988 (SI 1988/122)
- Housing Revenue Account Rate Fund Contribution Limits (Scotland) Order 1988 (SI 1988/123)
- Measuring Equipment (Liquid Fuel and Lubricants) Regulations 1988 (SI 1988/128)
- Stafford (Parishes) Order 1988 (SI 1988/129)
- Stratford-on-Avon (Parishes) Order 1988 (SI 1988/130)
- Swansea-Manchester Trunk Road (A483) and the Shrewsbury-Dolgellau Trunk Road (A458) (Welshpool North-South Relief Road) Order 1988 (SI 1988/131)
- Milk Marketing Scheme (Amendment) Regulations 1988 (SI 1988/132)
- Commission for Local Authority Accounts in Scotland Regulations 1988 (SI 1988/133)
- Wireless Telegraphy (Licence Charges) (Amendment) Regulations 1988 (SI 1988/135)
- Third Country Fishing (Enforcement) Order 1988 (SI 1988/136)
- Personal Pension Schemes (Appropriate Schemes) Regulations 1988 (SI 1988/137)
- London Regional Transport (Levy) Order 1988 (SI 1988/138)
- Town and Country Planning (Unitary Development Plans) Regulations 1988 (SI 1988/139)
- Unitary Development Plans (West Midlands) (Appointed Day) Order 1988 (SI 1988/140)
- A45 Felixstowe-Weedon Trunk Road (Kirton Road Roundabout Trimley St Martin) Detrunking Order 1988 (SI 1988/141)
- (A167) London—Edinburgh—Thurso Trunk Road (Former Darlington County Borough Boundary to Coatham Mundeville (Aycliffe) Interchange De-Trunking) Order 1988 (SI 1988/146)
- Ports (Finance) Act 1985 (Increase of Grants Limit) Order 1988 (SI 1988/152)
- Foreign Compensation Commission (People's Republic of China) Rules Approval Instrument 1988 (SI 1988/153)
- Babergh (Parishes) Order 1988 (SI 1988/154)
- Bradford (Parishes) Order 1988 (SI 1988/155)
- Wrekin (Parishes) Order 1988 (SI 1988/156)
- Community Charges (Registration) (Scotland) Regulations 1988 (SI 1988/157)
- United Kingdom Central Council for Nursing, Midwifery and Health Visiting (Electoral Scheme) (Variation) Order 1988 (SI 1988/158)
- Gas (Register) Order 1988 (SI 1988/159)
- Local Government (Direct Labour Organisations) (Competition) (Amendment) Regulations 1988 (SI 1988/160)
- Prosecution of Offences (Custody Time Limits) (Amendment) Regulations 1988 (SI 1988/164)
- Registration of Births, Deaths and Marriages (Fees) Order 1988 (SI 1988/165)
- London Traffic Control System (Transfer) Order 1988 (SI 1988/166)
- Merseyside Traffic Control System (Transfer) Order 1988 (SI 1988/167)
- Environmentally Sensitive Areas Designation (Wales) (Amendment) Order 1988 (SI 1988/173)
- Environmentally Sensitive Areas Designation (England) (Amendment) Order 1988 (SI 1988/174)
- Environmentally Sensitive Areas (The Broads) Designation (Amendment) Order 1988 (SI 1988/175)
- Environmentally Sensitive Areas (Somerset Levels and Moors) Designation (Amendment) Order 1988 (SI 1988/176)
- Local Government Act 1985 (Police and Fire and Civil Defence Authorities) Precepts Limitation Order 1988 (SI 1988/178)
- Finance Act 1987 (Commencement No. 1) Order 1988 (SI 1988/179)
- South Herefordshire (Parishes) Order 1988 (SI 1988/180)
- Wycombe (Parishes) Order 1988 (SI 1988/181)
- Scottish Milk Marketing Schemes (Amendment) Regulations 1988 (SI 1988/182)
- Customs Duties (ECSC) (Quota and Other Reliefs) (Amendment) Order 1988 (SI 1988/185)
- Measuring Instruments (EEC Requirements) Regulations 1988 (SI 1988/186)
- Commissioner for Local Administration in Scotland (Expenses) Regulations 1988 (SI 1988/187)
- Merchant Shipping (Passenger Boarding Cards) Regulations 1988 (SI 1988/191)
- Precept Limitation (Prescribed Maximum) (Greater Manchester Passenger Transport Authority) Order 1988 (SI 1988/192)
- Precept Limitation (Prescribed Maximum) (Merseyside Passenger Transport Authority) Order 1988 (SI 1988/193)
- Precept Limitation (Prescribed Maximum) (West Yorkshire Passenger Transport Authority) Order 1988 (SI 1988/194)
- Diseases of Fish (Definition of Infected) Order 1988 (SI 1988/195)
- County Council of the Royal County of Berkshire A329(M) Relief Road Special Road Variation Scheme 1987 Confirmation Instrument 1988 (SI 1988/196)
- Severn-Trent Water Authority (Woodfarm Camp Main) Order 1988 (SI 1988/197)
- Anatomy (Amendment) Regulations 1988 (SI 1988/198)
- Precept Limitation (Prescribed Maximum) (Inner London Education Authority) Order 1988 (SI 1988/199)

=== 201–300 ===
- West of Southampton—Bath Trunk Road A36 (Codford Bypass) Order 1988 SI 1988/204
- West of Southampton—Bath Trunk Road A36 (Codford Bypass) (Detrunking) Order 1988 SI 1988/205
- Cycle Racing on Highways (Amendment) Regulations 1988 SI 1988/215
- Pensions Increase (Review) Order 1988 SI 1988/217
- Fife and Tayside Regions and North East Fife and Perth and Kinross Districts (Duncrievie) Boundaries Amendment Order 1988 SI 1988/218 (S. 22)
- East Kilbride and City of Glasgow Districts (Carmunnock) Boundaries Amendment Order 1988 SI 1988/219 (S. 23)
- Strathclyde and Central Regions and Monklands and Falkirk Districts (Black Loch) Boundaries Amendment Order 1988 SI 1988/220 (S. 24)
- City of Glasgow and Strathkelvin Districts (Easter Balmuildy Farm and Laigh Kenmure Farm) Boundaries Amendment Order 1988 SI 1988/221 (S. 25)
- Central Regional Council (Kirkton Burn, Balquhidder) Water Order 1988 SI 1988/222
- Superannuation (Children's Pensions) (Earnings Limit) Order 1988 SI 1988/223
- Diseases of Animals (Approved Disinfectants) (Amendment) Order 1988 SI 1988/224
- Severn-Trent Water Authority (Hartlebury Borehole) Order 1988 SI 1988/225
- Matrimonial Causes (Amendment) Rules 1988 SI 1988/226
- Stock Transfer (Specified Securities) Order 1988 SI 1988/231
- Stock Transfer (Gilt-edged Securities) (Exempt Transfer) Regulations 1988 SI 1988/232
- London Government Reorganisation (Transfer of Loans) Order 1988 SI 1988/233
- National Assistance (Charges for Accommodation) Regulations 1988 SI 1988/234
- River Tweed (Baits and Lures) Regulations 1988 SI 1988/235
- Industrial Training Levy (Plastics Processing) Order 1988 SI 1988/236
- Severn-Trent Water Authority (Abolition of the Sinfin Moor Drainage District) Order 1987 SI 1988/237
- Agricultural Levy Reliefs (Frozen Beef and Veal) Order 1988 SI 1988/238
- Family Credit (Transitional) Amendment Regulations 1988 SI 1988/239
- Education (Grants) (Royal Ballet School) Regulations 1988 SI 1988/240
- Northamptonshire and Oxfordshire (County Boundaries) Order 1988 SI 1988/241
- Local Government Administration (Matters Subject to Investigation) Order 1988 SI 1988/242
- Carriage by Air (Parties to Convention) Order 1988 SI 1988/243
- Foreign Compensation (Financial Provisions) Order 1988 SI 1988/244
- International Trust Fund for Tuvalu (Immunities and Privileges) Order 1988 SI 1988/245
- Merchant Shipping Act 1970 (Cayman Islands) Order 1988 SI 1988/246
- Turks and Caicos Islands Constitution Order 1988 SI 1988/247
- Naval, Military and Air Forces etc. (Disablement and Death) Service Pensions Amendment Order 1988 SI 1988/248
- Sex Discrimination (Amendment) Order 1988 SI 1988/249
- Copyright (International Conventions) (Amendment) Order 1988 SI 1988/250
- Air Navigation (Third Amendment) Order 1988 SI 1988/251
- Merchant Shipping (Fishing Boats Registry) (Amendment) Order 1988 SI 1988/252
- Imperial War Museum (Board of Trustees) Order 1988 SI 1988/253
- Chester-Bangor Trunk Road (A55) (Travellers' Inn Improvement) Order 1988 SI 1988/254
- Combined Probation Areas (Northumbria) Order 1988 SI 1988/258
- Hereford and Worcester (District Boundaries) Order 1988 SI 1988/259
- Police (Promotion) (Scotland) Amendment Regulations 1988 SI 1988/260
- Cwmbran Development Corporation (Transfer of Property and Dissolution) Order 1988 SI 1988/265
- Capital Gains Tax (Definition of Unit Trust Scheme) Regulations 1988 SI 1988/266
- Income Tax (Definition of Unit Trust Scheme) Regulations 1988 SI 1988/267
- Stamp Duty and Stamp Duty Reserve Tax (Definitions of Unit Trust Scheme) Regulations 1988 SI 1988/268
- Social Security (Benefit) (Members of the Forces) Amendment Regulations 1988 SI 1988/269
- Home Purchase Assistance (Price-limits) Order 1988 SI 1988/270
- Road Vehicles (Construction and Use) (Amendment) Regulations 1988 SI 1988/271
- London-Carlisle-Glasgow-Inverness Trunk Road (A6) (Barton-Le-Clay Bypass and Slip Road) Order 1988 SI 1988/272
- London-Carlisle-Glasgow-Inverness Trunk Road (Barton-in-the-Clay Diversion) (Revocation) Order 1988 SI 1988/273
- Prevention of Terrorism (Temporary Provisions) Act 1984 (Continuance) Order 1988 SI 1988/274
- Industrial Training Levy (Engineering Board) Order 1988 SI 1988/275
- Employment Protection (Variation of Limits) Order 1988 SI 1988/276
- Unfair Dismissal (Increase of Limits of Basic and Special Awards) Order 1988 SI 1988/277
- County Court (Amendment) Rules 1988 SI 1988/278
- County Court (Forms) (Amendment) Rules 1988 SI 1988/279
- Authorised Unit Trust Scheme (Pricing of Units and Dealings by Trustee and Manager) Regulations 1988 SI 1988/280
- Agriculture (Maintenance, Repair and Insurance of Fixed Equipment) (Amendment) Regulations 1988 SI 1988/281
- Agriculture (Time-Limit) Regulations 1988 SI 1988/282
- Housing and Planning Act 1986 (Commencement No. 11) Order 1988 SI 1988/283
- Authorised Unit Trust Scheme (Investment and Borrowing Powers) Regulations 1988 SI 1988/284
- Welsh Water Authority (Ashgrove Treatment Works and Heronbridge to Sealand Pipeline and Associated Pipelines) Order 1988 SI 1988/285
- Rate Limitation (Prescribed Maximum) (Rates) Order 1988 SI 1988/286
- Protection of Wrecks (Designation No. 1 Order 1986) (Amendment) Order 1988 SI 1988/287
- Wildlife and Countryside Act 1981 (Variation of Schedules) Order 1988 SI 1988/288
- A406 London North Circular Trunk Road (Hanger Lane to Harrow Road Improvement, Trunk Road and Slip Roads) Order 1988 SI 1988/290
- The Vale Royal (Parishes) Order 1988 S.I. 1988/291
- The Staffordshire Moorlands (Parishes) Order 1988 S.I. 1988/292
- The North Shropshire (Parishes) Order 1988 S.I. 1988/293
- Residential Care Order (Secure Accommodation) (Scotland) Regulations 1988 SI 1988/294
- Control of Borrowing (Amendment) Order 1988 SI 1988/295
- Measuring Instruments (EEC Requirements) (Gas Volume Meters) Regulations 1988 SI 1988/296
- Pilotage Commission Provision of Funds Scheme 1988 (Confirmation) Order 1988 SI 1988/297
- Rules of the Supreme Court (Amendment) 1988 SI 1988/298
- Social Security (Contributions) Amendment Regulations 1988 SI 1988/299
- Exeter-Launceston-Bodmin Trunk Road A30 (Launceston to Plusha) (Detrunking) Order 1988 SI 1988/300

=== 301–400 ===
- Certification Officer (Amendment of Fees) Regulations 1988 SI 1988/310
- Misuse of Drugs (Licence Fees) (Amendment) Regulations 1988 SI 1988/311
- Northamptonshire and Warwickshire (County Boundaries) Order 1988 SI 1988/314
- West Midlands (District Boundaries) Order 1988 SI 1988/315
- Financial Services Act 1986 (Investment Advertisements) (Exemptions) Order 1988 SI 1988/316
- Merchant Shipping (Closing of Openings in Enclosed Superstructures and in Bulkheads above the Bulkhead Deck) Regulations 1988 SI 1988/317
- Financial Services Act 1986 (Restriction of Scope of Act) Order 1988 SI 1988/318
- Assisted Areas (Amendment) Order 1988 SI 1988/322
- London Government Reorganisation (Non-Domestic Mortgages) Order 1988 SI 1988/323
- Horsey Estate (Area of Special Protection) Order 1988 SI 1988/324
- The St. Edmundsbury (Parishes) Order 1988 S.I. 1988/325
- The Newark and Sherwood (Parishes) Order 1988 S.I. 1988/326
- Water Byelaws (Extension) (Scotland) Order 1988 SI 1988/327
- Jordanhill School Grant Regulations 1988 SI 1988/328
- Magistrates' Courts (Family Law Act 1986) Rules 1988 SI 1988/329
- Merchant Shipping (Light Dues) (Amendment) Regulations 1988 SI 1988/330
- National Assistance (Charges for Accommodation) (Scotland) Regulations 1988 SI 1988/331
- Local Authorities (Publicity Account) (Exemption) (Scotland) Order 1988 SI 1988/332
- Bingo Duty Regulations 1988 SI 1988/333
- Gaming Act (Variation of Fees) (No. 2) Order 1988 SI 1988/334
- Lotteries (Gaming Board Fees) Order 1988 SI 1988/335
- Sugar Beet (Research and Education) Order 1988 SI 1988/336
- Valuation Timetable (Scotland) Amendment Order 1988 SI 1988/337
- Goods Vehicles (Plating and Testing) (Amendment) Regulations 1988 SI 1988/338
- Motor Vehicles (Tests) (Amendment) Regulations 1988 SI 1988/339
- Public Service Vehicles (Conditions of Fitness, Equipment, Use and Certification) (Amendment) Regulations 1988 SI 1988/340
- Tayside, Fife and Central Regions and Perth and Kinross, Dunfermline and Clackmannan Districts (Solsgirth) Boundaries Amendment Order 1988 SI 1988/347 (S. 34)
- Ross and Cromarty and Inverness Districts (Monar Lodge) Boundaries Amendment Order 1988 SI 1988/348 (S. 35)
- Tayside and Grampian Regions and Angus and Kincardine and Deeside Districts (River North Esk) Boundaries Amendment Order 1988 SI 1988/349 (S. 36)
- Financial Services Act 1986 (Miscellaneous Exemptions) Order 1988 SI 1988/350
- Financial Services Tribunal (Conduct of Investigations) Rules 1988 SI 1988/351
- Insurance (Fees) Regulations 1988 SI 1988/352
- Education (Training Grants) (Amendment) Regulations 1988 SI 1988/355
- Plant Breeders' Rights (Fees) (Amendment) Regulations 1988 SI 1988/356
- Seeds (National Lists of Varieties) (Fees) (Amendment) Regulations 1988 SI 1988/357
- Local Government (Allowances) (Amendment) Regulations 1988 SI 1988/358
- Local Government Reorganisation (Capital Money) (Greater London) Order 1988 SI 1988/359
- Capital Gains Tax (Gilt-edged Securities) Order 1988 SI 1988/360
- Construction Plant and Equipment (Harmonisation of Noise Emission Standards) Regulations 1988 SI 1988/361
- Falling-object Protective Structures for Construction Plant (EEC Requirements) Regulations 1988 SI 1988/362
- Roll-over Protective Structures for Construction Plant (EEC Requirements) Regulations 1988 SI 1988/363
- National Health Service (Charges for Drugs and Appliances) (Scotland) Amendment Regulations 1988 SI 1988/365
- County of Mid Glamorgan (Electoral Arrangements) Order 1988 SI 1988/366
- Personal Injuries (Civilians) Amendment Scheme 1988 SI 1988/367
- International Carriage of Dangerous Goods by Road (Fees) Regulations 1988 SI 1988/370
- International Transport of Goods under Cover of TIR Carnets (Fees) Regulations 1988 SI 1988/371
- Local Authorities (Allowances) (Scotland) Amendment Regulations 1988 SI 1988/372
- Gaming Act (Variation of Fees) (Scotland) (No.2) Order 1988 SI 1988/373
- Upper Spey and Associated Waters Protection (Renewal) Order 1988 SI 1988/374
- Family Law Act 1986 (Commencement No.1) Order 1988 SI 1988/375
- Wireless Telegraphy (Broadcast Licence Charges and Exemption) (Amendment) Regulations 1988 SI 1988/376
- Teachers' Superannuation (Miscellaneous Provisions) Regulations 1988 SI 1988/387
- Civil Aviation (Navigation Services Charges) (Third Amendment) Regulations 1988 SI 1988/388
- Salmon (Weekly Close Time) (Scotland) Regulations 1988 SI 1988/390
- Registered Housing Associations (Accounting Requirements) Order 1988 SI 1988/395
- Feeding Stuffs Regulations 1988 SI 1988/396
- Criminal Justice Act 1987 (Commencement No. 2) Order 1988 SI 1988/397

=== 401–500 ===
- National Health Service (Constitution of District Health Authority) Order 1988 SI 1988/406
- National Health Service (Determination of Districts) Amendment Order 1988 SI 1988/407
- Public Service Vehicles (London Local Service Licences) (Amendment) Regulations 1988 SI 1988/408
- London — Portsmouth Trunk Road A3 (Liphook — Ham Barn Section) (Part 1) Order 1988 SI 1988/409
- London-Portsmouth Trunk Road A3 (Liphook-Ham Barn Section Slip Roads) (Part 1) Order 1988 SI 1988/410
- Aycliffe and Peterlee Development Corporation (Transfer of Property and Dissolution) Order 1988 SI 1988/412
- Washington Development Corporation (Transfer of Property and Dissolution) Order 1988 SI 1988/413
- Employment Protection (Recoupment of Unemployment Benefit and Supplementary Benefit) (Amendment) Regulations 1988 SI 1988/419
- Civil Legal Aid (Scotland) (Fees) Amendment Regulations 1988 SI 1988/420
- Criminal Legal Aid (Scotland) (Fees) Amendment Regulations 1988 SI 1988/421
- Legal Aid (Scotland) (Fees in Civil Proceedings) Amendment Regulations 1988 SI 1988/422
- Legal Aid in Criminal Proceedings (Costs) Regulations 1988 SI 1988/423
- Family Law Reform Act 1987 (Commencement No. 1) Order 1988 SI 1988/425
- Northern Ireland (Emergency Provisions) Acts 1978 and 1987 (Continuance) Order 1988 SI 1988/426
- National Health Service (Charges for Drugs and Appliances) Amendment Regulations 1988 SI 1988/427
- National Health Service (Payments for Optical Appliances) Amendment Regulations 1988 SI 1988/428
- Social Security (Earnings Factor) Amendment Regulations 1988 SI 1988/429
- Statutory Maternity Pay (Compensation of Employers) Amendment Regulations 1988 SI 1988/430
- Statutory Sick Pay (Additional Compensation of Employers) Amendment Regulations 1988 SI 1988/431
- Local Government (Prescribed Expenditure) (Amendment) Regulations 1988 SI 1988/434
- Social Security Benefit (Persons Abroad) Amendment Regulations 1988 SI 1988/435
- Social Security Benefits Up-rating Regulations 1988 SI 1988/436
- Education (Grants for Training of Teachers and Community Education Workers) (Scotland) SI 1988/437
- Financial Services (Designated Countries and Territories) (Overseas Insurance Companies) Order 1988 SI 1988/439
- Legal Advice and Assistance at Police Stations (Remuneration) Regulations 1988 SI 1988/446
- Legal Advice and Representation (Duty Solicitor) (Remuneration) (Amendment) Regulations 1988 SI 1988/447
- Building Societies (General Charge and Fees) Regulations 1988 SI 1988/448
- Friendly Societies (Fees) Regulations 1988 SI 1988/449
- Industrial and Provident Societies (Amendment of Fees) Regulations 1988 SI 1988/450
- Industrial and Provident Societies (Credit Unions) (Amendment of Fees) Regulations 1988 SI 1988/451
- Local Government Reorganisation (Debt Administration) (Merseyside) Order 1988 SI 1988/452
- Industrial Assurance (Fees) Regulations 1988 SI 1988/453
- Gipsy Encampments (District of Shepway) Order 1988 SI 1988/454
- Coal Industry (Limit on Deficit Grants) Order 1988 SI 1988/455
- Coal Industry (Restructuring Grants) Order 1988 SI 1988/456
- Meters (Certification) (Fees) Regulations 1988 SI 1988/457
- Housing Benefit (Transitional) Amendment Regulations 1988 SI 1988/458
- Legal Advice and Assistance (Financial Conditions) (No. 2) Regulations 1988 SI 1988/459
- Legal Aid (General) (Amendment) Regulations 1988 SI 1988/460
- Legal Advice and Assistance (Amendment) Regulations 1988 SI 1988/461
- National Health Service (Charges to Overseas Visitors) (Scotland) Amendment (No.2) Regulations 1988 SI 1988/462
- National Health Service (Payments for Optical Appliances) (Scotland) Amendment Regulations 1988 SI 1988/463
- National Health Service (Dental Charges) (Scotland) Regulations 1988 SI 1988/464
- Local Government (Superannuation and Compensation) (Amendment) Regulations 1988 SI 1988/466
- Legal Aid (Assessment of Resources) (Amendment) Regulations 1988 SI 1988/467
- Legal Aid in Criminal Proceedings (General) (Amendment) Regulations 1988 SI 1988/468
- Housing Benefit (Permitted Totals) Order 1988 SI 1988/471
- National Health Service (Charges to Overseas Visitors) Amendment (No. 2) Regulations 1988 SI 1988/472
- National Health Service (Dental Charges) Regulations 1988 SI 1988/473
- Personal and Occupational Pension Schemes (Tax Approval and Miscellaneous Provisions) Regulations 1988 SI 1988/474
- Contracting-out (Miscellaneous Amendments) Regulations 1988 SI 1988/475
- Occupational Pension Schemes (Miscellaneous Amendments) Regulations 1988 SI 1988/476
- Education (Mandatory Awards) (Amendment) Regulations 1988 SI 1988/477
- Merchant Shipping (Fees) (Amendment) Regulations 1988 SI 1988/478
- Merchant Shipping (Maintenance of Seamen's Dependants) (Amendment) Regulations 1988 SI 1988/479
- Landlord and Tenant Act 1987 (Commencement No. 2) Order 1988 SI 1988/480
- Scottish Islands Agricultural Development Programme Regulations 1988 SI 1988/481
- Criminal Justice (Scotland) Act 1987 (Commencement No.5) Order 1988 SI 1988/482
- Criminal Justice (Scotland) Act 1987 (Commencement No. 4) Order 1988 SI 1988/483
- Rent Assessment Committee (England and Wales) (Leasehold Valuation Tribunal) (Amendment) Regulations 1988 SI 1988/484
- Fire Safety and Safety of Places of Sport Act 1987 (Commencement No. 2) Order 1988 SI 1988/485
- National Health Service (General Ophthalmic Services) Amendment Regulations 1988 SI 1988/486
- Unemployment Benefit (Disqualification Period) Order 1988 SI 1988/487
- County Court (Records of Proceedings) (Amendment) Regulations 1988 SI 1988/488
- Advice and Assistance (Scotland) Amendment Regulations 1988 SI 1988/489
- Civil Legal Aid (Scotland) Amendment SI 1988/490
- Environmentally Sensitive Areas (Breadalbane) Designation (Amendment) Order 1988 SI 1988/491
- Environmentally Sensitive Areas (Loch Lomond) Designation (Amendment) Order 1988 SI 1988/492
- Environmentally Sensitive Areas (Stewartry) Designation Order 1988 SI 1988/493
- Environmentally Sensitive Areas (Whitlaw and Eildon) Designation Order 1988 SI 1988/494
- Environmentally Sensitive Areas (Machair of the Uists and Benbecula, Barra and Vatersay) Designation Order 1988 SI 1988/495
- Financial Services Act 1986 (Extension of Scope of Act and Meaning of Collective Investment Scheme) Order 1988 SI 1988/496

=== 501–600 ===
- The Milton Keynes (Parishes) Order 1988 S.I. 1988/501
- Banking Act 1987 (Commencement No. 3) Order 1988 SI 1988/502
- Income Tax (Indexation) Order 1988 SI 1988/503
- Occupational Pension Schemes (Rate of Tax under Paragraph 2(2) of Part II of Schedule 5 to the Finance Act 1970) Order 1988 SI 1988/504
- Inheritance Tax (Indexation) Order 1988 SI 1988/505
- Capital Gains Tax (Annual Exempt Amount) Order 1988 SI 1988/506
- Value Added Tax (Confectionery) Order 1988 SI 1988/507
- Value Added Tax (Increase of Registration Limits) Order 1988 SI 1988/508
- County Court Fees (Amendment) Order 1988 SI 1988/509
- Supreme Court Fees (Amendment) Order 1988 SI 1988/510
- The Tonbridge and Malling (Parishes) Order 1988 S.I. 1988/515
- Social Security (Credits) Amendment Regulations 1988 SI 1988/516
- Social Security Act 1988 (Commencement No. 1) Order 1988 SI 1988/520
- Income Support (Transitional) Amendment Regulations 1988 SI 1988/521
- Social Security (Claims and Payments) Amendment Regulations 1988 SI 1988/522
- Occupational Pension Schemes (Transfer Values) Amendment Regulations 1988 SI 1988/523
- Social Fund (Applications) Regulations 1988 SI 1988/524
- Veterinary Surgeons Act 1966 (Schedule 3 Amendment) Order 1988 SI 1988/526
- Social Security (Financial Adjustments) Order 1988 SI 1988/529
- Social Security (Attendance Allowance) Amendment Regulations 1988 SI 1988/531
- Statutory Maternity Pay (General) Amendment Regulations 1988 SI 1988/532
- Free Zone (Liverpool) Designation (Variation) Order 1988 SI 1988/533
- Dairy Produce Quotas (Amendment) Regulations 1988 SI 1988/534
- National Health Service (Supply of Goods at Clinics etc.) (Scotland) Amendment Regulations 1988 SI 1988/535
- Welfare Food Regulations 1988 SI 1988/536
- Prison (Scotland) Amendment Rules 1988 SI 1988/537
- European Communities (Iron and Steel Employees Re-adaptation Benefits Scheme) (No. 2) Regulations 1988 SI 1988/538
- Education (Teachers) (Amendment) Regulations 1988 SI 1988/542
- National Health Service (General Ophthalmic Services) (Scotland) Amendment Regulations 1988 SI 1988/543
- Social Security (Industrial Injuries) (Dependency Payments) Regulations 1988 SI 1988/544
- National Health Service (Payments for Optical Appliances) (Scotland) Amendment (No. 2) Regulations 1988 SI 1988/545
- National Health Service (Travelling Expenses and Remission of Charges) (Scotland) Regulations 1988 SI 1988/546
- Housing Support Grant (Scotland) Order 1988 SI 1988/547
- Housing Support Grant (Scotland) Variation Order 1988 SI 1988/548
- Anglian Water Authority (Does Corner Boreholes) Order 1988 SI 1988/549
- National Health Service (Travelling Expenses and Remission of Charges) Regulations 1988 SI 1988/551
- National Health Service (Payments for Optical Appliances) Amendment (No. 2) Regulations 1988 SI 1988/552
- Social Security (Industrial Injuries) (Miscellaneous Amendments) Regulations 1988 SI 1988/553
- Social Security Benefit (Dependency) Amendment Regulations 1988 SI 1988/554
- Welfare Food Amendment Regulations 1988 SI 1988/555
- Social Security Benefit (Dependency) Amendment (No. 2) Regulations 1988 SI 1988/556
- European Parliamentary Election Petition (Amendment) Rules 1988 SI 1988/557
- Weights and Measures (Northern Ireland) Order 1988 SI 1988/558
- Crofting Counties Agricultural Grants (Scotland) Scheme 1988 SI 1988/559
- A13 Trunk Road (East India Dock Road, Tower Hamlets) (Prescribed Routes) Order 1988 SI 1988/560
- Thames Water Authority (East Woodhay Boreholes) Order 1988 SI 1988/561
- Anglian Water Authority (Welton Borehole) Water Order 1988 SI 1988/562
- North Wales Police (Amalgamation) (Amendment) Order 1988 SI 1988/564
- Local Government Act 1985 (Severn-Trent Water Authority Regional Land Drainage Committee) (Revocation) Order 1988 SI 1988/565
- Severn-Trent Water Authority (Regional Land Drainage Committee) Order 1988 SI 1988/566
- Social Security Act 1986 (Commencement No. 9) Order 1988 SI 1988/567
- War Pensions (Chinese Seamen and Indian Seamen) (Revocations) Order 1988 SI 1988/568
- Protection of Trading Interests (Australian Trade Practices) Order 1988 SI 1988/569
- (A18) Sheffield—Grimsby Trunk Road (Barnetby Top to Grimsby) (Detrunking) Order 1988 SI 1988/570
- Public Trustee (Fees) (Amendment) Order 1988 SI 1988/571
- Workmen's Compensation (Supplementation) Amendment Scheme 1988 SI 1988/574
- Petty Sessional Divisions (Suffolk) Order 1988 SI 1988/575
- National Health Service (General Dental Services) Amendment Regulations 1988 SI 1988/576
- A19 Trunk Road (York Outer Ring Road to Clifton) (Detrunking) Order 1988 SI 1988/578
- A604 Catthorpe — Harwich Trunk Road (Kettering to Thrapston Section and Slip Roads) Supplementary Order 1988 SI 1988/581
- Parliamentary Commissioner Order 1988 SI 1988/585
- Antarctic Treaty (Agreed Measures) Order 1988 SI 1988/586
- Antarctic Treaty (Specially Protected Areas) Order 1988 SI 1988/587
- Child Abduction and Custody (Parties to Conventions) (Amendment) Order 1988 SI 1988/588
- Health Service Commissioner for England (Health Education Authority) Order 1988 SI 1988/589
- Social Security (Sweden) Order 1988 SI 1988/590
- Social Security (Reciprocal Agreements) Order 1988 SI 1988/591
- Appropriation (Northern Ireland) Order 1988 SI 1988/592
- Drug Trafficking Offences (Enforcement in England and Wales) Order 1988 SI 1988/593
- Social Security (Northern Ireland) Order 1988 SI 1988/594
- Statistics of Trade and Employment (Northern Ireland) Order 1988 SI 1988/595
- Registration of Title Order 1988 SI 1988/596
- Health Service Commissioner for Wales (Welsh Health Promotion Authority) Order 1988 SI 1988/597

=== 601–700 ===
- Dutch Elm Disease (Local Authorities) (Amendment) Order 1988 SI 1988/604
- Dutch Elm Disease (Restriction on Movement of Elms) (Amendment) Order 1988 SI 1988/605
- County Council of Isle of Wight New Yar Bridge Scheme 1985 Confirmation Instrument 1988 SI 1988/606
- (A435) Bath—Lincoln Trunk Road (Sedgeberrow Bypass) Order 1988 SI 1988/608
- Public Lending Right (Increase of Limit) Order 1988 SI 1988/609
- Combined Probation Areas (Suffolk) Order 1988 SI 1988/612
- Act of Sederunt (Rules for the Registration of Custody Orders of the Sheriff Court) 1988 SI 1988/613
- Act of Sederunt (Sheriff Court Ordinary Cause Rules Amendment No.1) (Family Law) 1988 SI 1988/614
- Act of Sederunt (Rules of the Court of Session Amendment No.1) (Family Law) 1988 SI 1988/615
- Social Security Pensions (Home Responsibilities and Miscellaneous Amendments) Amendment Regulations 1988 SI 1988/623
- Injuries in War (Shore Employments) Compensation (Amendment) Scheme 1988 SI 1988/624
- Local Government Superannuation (Scotland) Amendment Regulations 1988 SI 1988/625
- Fire Safety and Safety of Places of Sport Act 1987 (Commencement No.3) (Scotland) Order 1988 SI 1988/626
- Weights and Measures (Quantity Marking and Abbreviations of Units) (Amendment) Regulations 1988 SI 1988/627
- Land Registration (Official Searches) Rules 1988 SI 1988/629
- Building Societies (Designation of Prescribed Regulatory Authorities) Order 1988 SI 1988/630
- Standard and Collective Community Charges (Scotland) Regulations 1988 SI 1988/631
- Personal Community Charge (Students) (Scotland) Regulations 1988 SI 1988/632
- Prior Rights of Surviving Spouse (Scotland) Order 1988 SI 1988/633
- Submarine Pipe-lines (Designated Owners) Order 1988 SI 1988/634
- Local Loans (Increase of Limit) Order 1988 SI 1988/635
- Income Tax (Sub-Contractors in the Construction Industry) Regulations 1988 SI 1988/636
- Income Tax (Employments) (No.17) Regulations 1988 SI 1988/637
- Registration of Births and Deaths (Amendment) Regulations 1988 SI 1988/638
- War Pensions (Mercantile Marine) (Amendment) Scheme 1988 SI 1988/639
- Profit-Related Pay (Shortfall Recovery) Regulations 1988 SI 1988/640
- Merchant Shipping (Passenger Boarding Cards) (Application to non-UK Ships) Regulations 1988 SI 1988/641
- Merchant Shipping (Closing of Openings in Enclosed Superstructures and in Bulkheads above the Bulkhead Deck) (Application to Non-United Kingdom ships) Regulations 1988 SI 1988/642
- Department of Transport (Fees) Order 1988 SI 1988/643
- Banking Act 1987 (Commencement No. 4) Order 1988 SI 1988/644
- Banking Act 1987 (Advertisements) Regulations 1988 SI 1988/645
- Banking Act 1987 (Exempt Transactions) Regulations 1988 SI 1988/646
- State Scheme Premiums (Actuarial Tables) Amendment Regulations 1988 SI 1988/647
- (A1) London—Edinburgh—Thurso Trunk Road (Newcastle Western Bypass and Slip Roads) Order 1986 Variation Order 1988 SI 1988/652
- Milk Quota (Calculation of Standard Quota) (Amendment) Order 1988 SI 1988/653
- Finance Act 1986 (Stamp Duty and Stamp Duty Reserve Tax) (Amendment) Regulations 1988 SI 1988/654
- A1 Trunk Road (Barnet Way, Barnet) (Box Junction) Order 1988 SI 1988/656
- Personal Equity Plan (Amendment) Regulations 1988 SI 1988/657
- A1 Trunk Road (Barnet Way, Barnet) (Prescribed Routes) Order 1988 SI 1988/658
- Family Credit (General) Amendment Regulations 1988 SI 1988/660
- Housing Benefit (General) Amendment Regulations 1988 SI 1988/661
- Housing Benefit (Supply of Information) Regulations 1988 SI 1988/662
- Income Support (General) Amendment Regulations 1988 SI 1988/663
- Social Security (Payments on account, Overpayments and Recovery) Regulations 1988 SI 1988/664
- Land Registration Fee Order 1988 SI 1988/665
- Legal Advice and Assistance (Financial Conditions) Regulations 1988 SI 1988/666
- Legal Aid (Financial Conditions) Regulations 1988 SI 1988/667
- Pneumoconiosis etc. (Workers' Compensation) (Payment of Claims) Regulations 1988 SI 1988/668
- Gipsy Encampments (Metropolitan Borough of Gateshead) Order 1988 SI 1988/669
- Income Support (Transitional) Amendment No. 2 Regulations 1988 SI 1988/670
- Seed Potatoes (Fees) (Scotland) Regulations 1988 SI 1988/671
- Insurance Companies (Accounts and Statements) (Amendment) Regulations 1988 SI 1988/672
- Insurance Companies (Amendment) Regulations 1988 SI 1988/673
- Social Security (Contributions) Amendment (No. 2) Regulations 1988 SI 1988/674
- Social Security (Contributions, Re-rating) Order 1988 SI 1988/675
- Social Security (Treasury Supplement to and Allocation of Contributions) (Re-rating) Order 1988 SI 1988/676
- Salmon and Freshwater Fisheries (Expenses) Regulations 1988 SI 1988/677
- North West Water Authority (Knowsley Park Water Mains) Order 1988 SI 1988/680
- Act of Sederunt (Fees of Solicitors in the Sheriff Court) 1988 SI 1988/681
- Act of Sederunt (Exchequer Causes) 1988 SI 1988/682
- Cod (Specified Sea Areas) (Prohibition of Fishing) Order 1988 SI 1988/683
- Act of Sederunt (Rules of the Court of Session Amendment No.2) (Solicitors' Fees) 1988 SI 1988/684
- Advice and Assistance (Financial Conditions) (Scotland) Regulations 1988 SI 1988/685
- Civil Legal Aid (Financial Conditions) (Scotland) Regulations 1988 SI 1988/686
- Registration of Births and Deaths (Welsh Language) (Amendment) Regulations 1988 SI 1988/687
- Social Security (Payments on account, Overpayments and Recovery) Amendment Regulations 1988 SI 1988/688
- Social Security (Unemployment, Sickness and Invalidity Benefit) Amendment Regulations 1988 SI 1988/689

=== 701–800 ===
- Medicines (Hormone Growth Promoters) (Prohibition of Use) Regulations 1988 SI 1988/705
- Public Companies (Disclosure of Interests in Shares) (Investment Management Exclusion) Regulations 1988 SI 1988/706
- Consumer Credit (Exempt Agreements) (No. 2) (Amendment) Order 1988 SI 1988/707
- Free Zone (Amendment) Regulations 1988 SI 1988/710
- Asbestos (Prohibitions) (Amendment) Regulations 1988 SI 1988/711
- Health and Safety (Fees) Regulations 1988 SI 1988/712
- Local Government Reorganisation (Property) (Greater Manchester) Order 1988 SI 1988/713
- Milk Quota (Calculation of Standard Quota) (Scotland) Amendment Order 1988 SI 1988/714
- Multilateral Investment Guarantee Agency Act 1988 (Commencement) Order 1988 SI 1988/715
- Financial Services Act 1986 (Investment Advertisements) (Exemptions) (No. 2) Order 1988 SI 1988/716
- Financial Services Act 1986 (Stabilisation) Order 1988 SI 1988/717
- Financial Services Act 1986 (Miscellaneous Exemptions) (No.2) Order 1988 SI 1988/723
- Financial Services Act 1986 (Occupational Pension Schemes) (No.2) Order 1988 SI 1988/724
- Kinneil and Manuel Light Railway Order 1988 (SI 1988/725)
- Town and Country Planning (Compensation for Restrictions on Mineral Working) (Amendment) Regulations 1988 SI 1988/726
- Police (Amendment) Regulations 1988 SI 1988/727
- Police Cadets (Amendment) Regulations 1988 SI 1988/728
- Rate Limitation (Designation of Authorities) (Exemption) Order 1988 SI 1988/729
- A13 Trunk Road (Newham, Barking and Dagenham, and Havering) (Speed Limits) Order 1988 SI 1988/730
- Parsley (Temporary Prohibition on Landing) (Great Britain) Order 1988 SI 1988/736
- A406 Trunk Road (South Woodford to Barking Relief Road, Redbridge, Newham, Barking and Dagenham) (Speed Limits) Order 1988 SI 1988/737
- Financial Services Act 1986 (Delegation) (No. 2) Order 1988 SI 1988/738
- Financial Services Act 1986 (Commencement) (No. 8) Order 1988 SI 1988/740
- Submarine Pipe-lines (Designated Owners) (No. 2) Order 1988 SI 1988/741
- PARLIAMENT SI 1988/742
- Commissioners for Oaths (Fees) Order 1988 SI 1988/743
- Finance (No. 2) Act 1987 (Commencement) Order 1988 SI 1988/744
- Income and Corporation Taxes Act 1988 (Appointed Day) Order 1988 SI 1988/745
- Clydebank and City of Glasgow Districts (Yoker) Boundaries Amendment Order 1988 SI 1988/746 (S. 81)
- Prison (Amendment) (No. 2) Rules 1988 SI 1988/747
- International Development Association (Eighth Replenishment) Order 1988 SI 1988/750
- Local Government Reorganisation (Property) (West Yorkshire) Order 1988 SI 1988/751
- Income Tax (Interest on Unpaid Tax and Repayment Supplement) Order 1988 SI 1988/756
- Income Tax (Official Rate of Interest on Beneficial Loans) Order 1988 SI 1988/757
- Stamp Duty Reserve Tax (Interest on Tax Repaid) Order 1988 SI 1988/758
- Community Drivers' Hours and Recording Equipment (Exemptions and Supplementary Provisions) (Amendment) Regulations 1988 SI 1988/760
- A405 North Orbital Road (Long Lane Roundabout — A412) and Connecting Roads Detrunking Order 1988 SI 1988/761
- Chester-Bangor Trunk Road (Conwy Morfa to Llanfairfechan, Pen-y-Clip Section) Order 1988 SI 1988/762
- Cubic Measures (Ballast and Agricultural Materials) (Amendment) Regulations 1988 SI 1988/765
- Classification, Packaging and Labelling of Dangerous Substances (Amendment) Regulations 1988 SI 1988/766
- A6 Trunk Road (The Leicester City Boundary to the Southern District Distributor Road) Detrunking Order 1988 SI 1988/771
- Civil Aviation (Canadian Navigation Services) (Amendment) Regulations 1988 SI 1988/772
- (A49) Shrewsbury to Whitchurch to Warrington Trunk Road (Improvement at Holloway Mouth) Order 1988 SI 1988/775
- Building Societies (Supplementary Capital) Order 1988 SI 1988/777
- Ionising Radiation (Protection of Persons Undergoing Medical Examination or Treatment) Regulations 1988 SI 1988/778
- Finance Act 1987 (Commencement No.2) Order 1988 SI 1988/780
- Income Tax (Interest Relief) (Qualifying Lenders) Order 1988 SI 1988/781
- Local Government Reorganisation (Property) (West Midlands) Order 1988 SI 1988/783
- Veterinary Surgeons (Agreement with the Republic of Ireland) Order 1988 SI 1988/784
- European Communities (Designation) Order 1988 SI 1988/785
- Antarctic Treaty (Contracting Parties) Order 1988 SI 1988/786
- Merchant Shipping (Confirmation of Legislation) (Gibraltar) Order 1988 SI 1988/787
- Merchant Shipping (Prevention of Oil Pollution) (Bermuda) Order 1988 SI 1988/788
- Merchant Shipping Act 1974 (Cayman Islands) Order 1988 SI 1988/789
- Merchant Shipping Act 1979 (Cayman Islands) Order 1988 SI 1988/790
- Multilateral Investment Guarantee Agency (Overseas Territories) Order 1988 SI 1988/791
- Treaty on the Elimination of Intermediate-Range and Shorter-Range Missiles (Inspections) (Privileges and Immunities) Order 1988 SI 1988/792
- Criminal Injuries (Compensation) (Northern Ireland) Order 1988 SI 1988/793
- Crossbows (Northern Ireland) Order 1988 SI 1988/794
- General Assistance Grants (Abolition) (Northern Ireland) Order 1988 SI 1988/795
- Wages (Northern Ireland) Order 1988 SI 1988/796
- Copyright (Sound Recordings) (Indonesia) Order 1988 SI 1988/797
- High Court of Justiciary Fees Amendment Order 1988 SI 1988/798
- Court of Session etc. Fees Amendment Order 1988 SI 1988/799

=== 801–900 ===
- Cosmetic Products (Safety) (Amendment) Regulations 1988 SI 1988/802
- Financial Services Act 1986 (Restriction of Scope of Act and Meaning of Collective Investment Scheme) Order 1988 SI 1988/803
- Submarine Pipe-lines (Designated Owners) (No. 3) Order 1988 SI 1988/804
- Submarine Pipe-lines (Designated Owners) (No. 4) Order 1988 SI 1988/805
- Crown Prosecution Service (Witnesses' Allowances) (Amendment No. 7) Regulations 1988 SI 1988/807
- National Health Service (Joint Ophthalmic Committees) (Scotland) Revocation Order 1988 SI 1988/808
- Excise Warehousing (Etc.) Regulations 1988 SI 1988/809
- Transit of Animals (Amendment) Order 1988 SI 1988/815
- Teachers' Superannuation (Miscellaneous Provisions) (No. 2) Regulations 1988 SI 1988/816
- Court Funds (Amendment) Rules 1988 SI 1988/817
- Control of Pollution Act 1974 (Commencement No. 19) Order 1988 SI 1988/818
- Collection and Disposal of Waste Regulations 1988 SI 1988/819
- Housing Defects (Expenditure Limits) Order 1988 SI 1988/820
- South West Water Authority (River Lew Discharge) Order 1988 SI 1988/828
- A3 Trunk Road (Service Roads, Kingston upon Thames and Merton) (Restricted Roads) (Direction) Order 1988 SI 1988/829
- Personal Pension Schemes (Miscellaneous Amendments) Regulations 1988 SI 1988/830
- Public Telecommunication System Designation (City Centre Cable) Order 1988 SI 1988/831
- County of Gwynedd (Electoral Arrangements) Order 1988 SI 1988/832
- Stamp Duty Reserve Tax (Amendment) Regulations 1988 SI 1988/835
- Meat and Livestock Commission Levy (Variation) Scheme (Confirmation) Order 1988 SI 1988/838
- Secure Accommodation (Scotland) Amendment Regulations 1988 SI 1988/841
- Road Vehicles (Excise) (Prescribed Particulars) (Amendment) Regulations 1988 SI 1988/847
- Animals and Fresh Meat (Examination for Residues) Regulations 1988 SI 1988/848
- Animals and Fresh Meat (Hormonal Substances) Regulations 1988 SI 1988/849
- Welfare of Poultry (Transport) Order 1988 SI 1988/851
- National Health Service (General Dental Services) (Scotland) Amendment Regulations 1988 SI 1988/854
- Patents (Fees) Rules 1988 SI 1988/855
- Registered Designs (Fees) Rules 1988 SI 1988/856
- Social Security (Contributions) Amendment (No. 3) Regulations 1988 SI 1988/860
- North Surrey Water Order 1988 SI 1988/861
- National Health Service Functions (Directions to Authorities and Administration Arrangements) Amendment Regulations 1988 SI 1988/864
- National Health Service (Payment of Remuneration — Special Arrangement) Order 1988 SI 1988/865
- National Health Service (General Medical and Pharmaceutical Services and Charges for Drugs) Amendment Regulations 1988 SI 1988/866
- Social Security Revaluation of Earnings Factors Order 1988 SI 1988/867
- Domestic Courts (Constitution) (Amendment) Rules 1988 SI 1988/868
- Domestic Courts (Constitution) (Inner London) (Amendment) Rules 1988 SI 1988/869
- Matrimonial Causes Fees (Amendment) Order 1988 SI 1988/870
- Building (Amendment of Prescribed Fees) Regulations 1988 SI 1988/871
- Acquisition of Land (Rate of Interest after Entry) Regulations 1988 SI 1988/874
- Acquisition of Land (Rate of Interest after Entry) (Scotland) Regulations 1988 SI 1988/875
- Weighing Equipment (Non-automatic Weighing Machines) Regulations 1988 SI 1988/876
- National Health Service (Service Committees and Tribunal) (Scotland) Amendment Regulations 1988 SI 1988/878
- Public Utility Transfers and Water Charges Act 1988 (Commencement No. 1) Order 1988 SI 1988/879
- Submarine Pipe-lines (Designated Owners) (No. 5) Order 1988 SI 1988/881
- Submarine Pipe-lines (Designated Owners) (No. 6) Order 1988 SI 1988/882
- Submarine Pipe-lines (Designated Owners) (No. 7) Order 1988 SI 1988/883
- Housing Defects (Reinstatement Grant) (Amendment of Conditions for Assistance) Order 1988 SI 1988/884
- Value Added Tax (Annual Accounting) Regulations 1988 SI 1988/886
- Companies (Fees) Regulations 1988 SI 1988/887
- Opencast Coal (Rate of Interest on Compensation) Order 1988 SI 1988/890
- Trade Marks and Service Marks (Fees) Rules 1988 SI 1988/894
- Weights and Measures (Knitting Yarns) Order 1988 SI 1988/895
- Pressure Vessels (Verification) Regulations 1988 SI 1988/896
- County Court (Amendment No. 2) Rules 1988 SI 1988/897
- Wireless Telegraphy (Broadcast Licence Charges and Exemption) (Amendment No. 2) Regulations 1988 SI 1988/899
- Urban Development Corporations (Appropriate Ministers) Order 1988 SI 1988/900

=== 901–1000 ===
- Industrial Training Levy (Hotel and Catering) Order 1988 (SI 1988/901)
- A2 Trunk Road (Rochester Way Relief Road, Greenwich and Bexley) (Speed Limits) Order 1988 (SI 1988/902)
- Scottish Transport Group (Castle Bay Pier) Empowerment Order 1988 (SI 1988/904)
- Caribbean Development Bank (Further Payments) Order 1988 (SI 1988/906)
- Redundancy Payments (Local Government) (Modification) (Amendment) Order 1988 (SI 1988/907)
- Family Credit (General) Amendment No. 2 Regulations 1988 (SI 1988/908)
- Housing Benefit (General) Amendment No. 2 Regulations 1988 (SI 1988/909)
- Income Support (General) Amendment No. 2 Regulations 1988 (SI 1988/910)
- Submarine Pipe-lines (Designated Owners) (No. 8) Order 1988 SI 1988/911
- Submarine Pipe-lines (Designated Owners) (No. 9) Order 1988 SI 1988/912
- Magistrates' Courts (Children and Young Persons) Rules 1988 SI 1988/913
- Control of Misleading Advertisements Regulations 1988 SI 1988/915
- Misuse of Drugs (Amendment) Regulations 1988 SI 1988/916
- (A1237) York Outer Ring Road (Northern) (Trunking) Order 1988 SI 1988/917
- (A41) East of Birmingham to Birkenhead and the (A49) Shrewsbury to Warrington Trunk Roads (Whitchurch Bypass) Order 1988 SI 1988/918
- Assured Tenancies (Approved Bodies) (No. 2) Order 1988 SI 1988/919
- (A696) Newcastle—Edinburgh Trunk Road (Prestwick Terrace to Kenton Bank Foot De-Trunking) Order 1988 SI 1988/920
- (A696) Newcastle-Edinburgh Trunk Road (Woolsington Bypass and Slip Roads) Order 1988 SI 1988/921
- Legal Aid (Scotland) (Fees in Criminal Proceedings) Amendment Regulations 1988 SI 1988/922
- Housing Defects (Expenditure Limits) (No. 2) Order 1988 SI 1988/923
- Anglian Water Authority (Newton on Trent) Water Order 1988 SI 1988/924
- Consular Fees (Amendment) Order 1988 SI 1988/925
- European Committee for the Prevention of Torture and Inhuman or Degrading Treatment or Punishment (Immunities and Privileges) Order 1988 SI 1988/926
- Merchant Shipping (Confirmation of Legislation) (Bermuda) Order 1988 SI 1988/927
- Merchant Shipping (Confirmation of Legislation) (Cayman Islands) Order 1988 SI 1988/928
- Fees &c (Northern Ireland) Order 1988 SI 1988/929
- Minors' Contracts (Northern Ireland) Order 1988 SI 1988/930
- Summer Time Order 1988 SI 1988/931
- Double Taxation Relief (Taxes on Income) (Turkey) Order 1988 SI 1988/932
- Double Taxation Relief (Taxes on Income) (Venezuela) Order 1988 SI 1988/933
- Town and Country Planning (Inquiries Procedure) Rules 1988 SI 1988/944
- Town and Country Planning Appeals (Determination by Inspectors) (Inquiries Procedure) Rules 1988 SI 1988/945
- Insurance Brokers Registration Council (Conduct of Investment Business) Rules Approval Order 1988 SI 1988/950
- Food Protection (Emergency Prohibitions) (Wales) (No. 5) Amendment No. 2 Order 1988 SI 1988/951
- Crown Court (Amendment) Rules 1988 SI 1988/952
- Export of Sheep (Prohibition) (No. 2) Amendment No. 2 Order 1988 SI 1988/953
- Food Protection (Emergency Prohibitions) (England) Amendment No. 2 Order 1988 SI 1988/954
- Norfolk and Suffolk Broads Act 1988 (Commencement) Order 1988 SI 1988/955
- Local Government (Direct Labour Organisations) (Competition) (Scotland) Amendment Regulations 1988 SI 1988/956
- Coast Protection (Notices) (Scotland) Regulations 1988 SI 1988/957
- Consumer Protection (Cancellation of Contracts Concluded away from Business Premises) (Amendment) Regulations 1988 SI 1988/958
- Heavy Goods Vehicles (Drivers' Licences) (Amendment) Regulations 1988 SI 1988/959
- Public Service Vehicles (Drivers' Licences) (Amendment) Regulations 1988 SI 1988/960
- Social Security Act 1986 (Consequential) Amendment Regulations 1988 SI 1988/961
- British Transport (Alteration of Pension Schemes) (Amendment) Order 1988 SI 1988/962
- Town and Country Planning (Tree Preservation Order) (Amendment) Regulations 1988 SI 1988/963
- Food Protection (Emergency Prohibitions) Amendment Order 1988 Approved by both Houses of Parliament SI 1988/964
- Motor Vehicles (Driving Licences) (Amendment) Regulations 1988 SI 1988/965
- Sheriff Court Fees Amendment Order 1988 SI 1988/966
- Rate Limitation (Designation of Authorities) (Exemption) (Wales) Order 1988 SI 1988/968
- Court of Session etc. Fees Amendment (No.2) Order 1988 SI 1988/969
- Forestry (Exceptions from Restriction of Felling) (Amendment) Regulations 1988 SI 1988/970
- Restriction on Movement of Spruce Wood (Amendment) Order 1988 SI 1988/971
- Docks and Harbours (Rateable Values) (Amendment) Order 1988 SI 1988/974
- Medicines (Medicated Animal Feeding Stuffs) Regulations 1988 SI 1988/976
- Town and Country Planning (General Development) (Scotland) Amendment Order 1988 SI 1988/977
- Housing Defects (Reinstatement Grant) (Amendment of Conditions for Assistance) (Scotland) Order 1988 SI 1988/978
- Local Government Act 1988 (Commencement No. 1) Order 1988 SI 1988/979
- Gas (Meters) (Amendment) Regulations 1988 SI 1988/980
- Submarine Pipe-lines (Designated Owners) (No. 10) Order 1988 SI 1988/981
- Submarine Pipe-lines (Designated Owners) (No. 11) Order 1988 SI 1988/982
- Submarine Pipe-lines (Designated Owners) (No. 12) Order 1988 SI 1988/983
- Motor Vehicles (Tests) (Amendment) (No.2) Regulations 1988 SI 1988/989
- Consumer Credit (Exempt Agreements) (No. 2) (Amendment No. 2) Order 1988 SI 1988/991
- Social Security (Contributions) Amendment (No. 4) Regulations 1988 SI 1988/992
- Personal Pension Schemes (Establishment of Schemes) Order 1988 SI 1988/993
- Esk Salmon Fishery District Designation Order 1988 SI 1988/994
- Financial Services Act 1986 (Commencement) (No. 9) Order 1988 SI 1988/995
- London Cab Order 1988 SI 1988/996
- Measuring Equipment (Cold-water Meters) Regulations 1988 SI 1988/997
- Commissioners for Oaths (Fees) (No. 2) Order 1988 SI 1988/998
- Family Credit and Income Support (General) Amendment Regulations 1988 SI 1988/999
- Intervention Functions (Delegation) (Amendment) Regulations 1988 SI 1988/1000

=== 1001–1100 ===
- Cereals Co-responsibility Levy Regulations 1988 SI 1988/1001
- Income and Corporation Taxes Act 1988 (Appointed Day No. 2) Order 1988 SI 1988/1002
- Northern Ireland (Emergency Provisions) Act 1987 (Commencement No. 2) Order 1988 SI 1988/1005
- Medicines (Labelling of Medicinal Products for Incorporation in Animal Feeding Stuffs and of Medicated Animal Feeding Stuffs) Regulations 1988 SI 1988/1009
- Merchant Shipping Act 1988 (Commencement No. 1) Order 1988 SI 1988/1010
- Income Tax (Building Societies) (Amendment) Regulations 1988 SI 1988/1011
- Personal Pension Schemes (Minimum Contributions under the Social Security Act 1986) Regulations 1988 SI 1988/1012
- Personal Pension Schemes (Relief at Source) Regulations 1988 SI 1988/1013
- Personal Pension Schemes (Transfer Payments) Regulations 1988 SI 1988/1014
- Medicines (Exemptions from Restrictions on the Retail Sale or Supply of Veterinary Drugs) (Amendment) Order 1988 SI 1988/1015
- Personal and Occupational Pension Schemes (Transfer to Self-employed Pension Arrangements) Regulations 1988 SI 1988/1016
- Restriction on Conduct (Specialist Advertising Services) Order 1988 SI 1988/1017
- Video Recordings Act 1984 (Commencement No. 7) Order 1988 SI 1988/1018
- London Government Reorganisation (Transfer of Loans) (Amendment) Order 1988 SI 1988/1019
- Education (School Information) (Amendment) Regulations 1988 SI 1988/1023
- Stanswood Bay Oyster Fishery Order 1988 SI 1988/1024
- Amusements with Prizes (Variation of Monetary Limits) Order 1988 SI 1988/1025
- Gaming Act (Variation of Monetary Limits) Order 1988 SI 1988/1026
- Gaming Clubs (Hours and Charges) (Amendment) Regulations 1988 SI 1988/1027
- Gaming (Small Charges) (Amendment) Order 1988 SI 1988/1028
- National Savings Bank (Investment Deposits) (Limits) (Amendment) Order 1988 SI 1988/1030
- Motor Cycles (Eye Protectors) (Amendment) Regulations 1988 SI 1988/1031
- Act of Sederunt (Rules of the Court of Session Amendment No.3) (Shorthand Writers' Fees) 1988 SI 1988/1032
- Act of Sederunt (Shorthand Writers' Fees) 1988 SI 1988/1033
- Road Traffic Act 1972 (Amendment) Regulations 1988 SI 1988/1036
- Transport Act 1981 (Commencement No. 12) Order 1988 SI 1988/1037
- Bovine Spongiform Encephalopathy Order 1988 SI 1988/1039
- Gloucester Harbour Revision Order 1988 SI 1988/1040
- Education Authority Bursaries (Scotland) Regulations 1988 SI 1988/1042
- Local Government Act 1988 (Commencement No.2) (Scotland) Order 1988 SI 1988/1043
- AIDS (Control) (Contents of Reports) (No. 2) Order 1988 SI 1988/1047
- Water (Meters) Regulations 1988 SI 1988/1048
- Trunk Road A1081 (Bell Roundabout — London Colney Roundabout, Hertfordshire) (Detrunking) Order 1988 SI 1988/1049
- Gaming Act (Variation of Monetary Limits) (Scotland) Order 1988 SI 1988/1050
- Gaming (Small Charges) (Scotland) Amendment Order 1988 SI 1988/1051
- Gaming Clubs (Hours and Charges) (Scotland) Amendment Regulations 1988 SI 1988/1052
- Amusements with Prizes (Variation of Monetary Limits) (Scotland) Order 1988 SI 1988/1053
- Crown Prosecution Service (Witnesses' Allowances) (Amendment No. 8) Regulations 1988 SI 1988/1054
- Education (School Teachers' Pay and Conditions) Order 1988 SI 1988/1055
- Agriculture Improvement (Variation) Scheme 1988 SI 1988/1056
- Electricity Supply Regulations 1988 SI 1988/1057
- Financial Services (Disclosure of Information) (Designated Authorities) (No. 4) Order 1988 SI 1988/1058
- (A47) Birmingham-Great Yarmouth Trunk Road (Easton Hornstocks Bends Improvement) Order 1988 SI 1988/1060
- Motor Vehicles (Driving Licences) (Amendment) (No. 2) Regulations 1988 SI 1988/1062
- Customs Duties (ECSC) (Amendment No. 1) Order 1988 SI 1988/1065
- London-Portsmouth Trunk Road A3 (Ham Barn-Petersfield Section Slip Roads) (No. 2) Order 1988 SI 1988/1066
- Education (Special Educational Needs) (Amendment) Regulations 1988 SI 1988/1067
- Charities (University of Liverpool) Order 1988 SI 1988/1068
- Magistrates' Courts (Increase of Lump Sums) Order 1988 SI 1988/1069
- National Health Service (General Medical and Pharmaceutical Services and Charges for Drugs) (Scotland) Amendment Regulations 1988 SI 1988/1073
- (A43) Oxford—Market Deeping Trunk Road (Moulton Crossroads to Overstone Grange Improvement) Order 1988 SI 1988/1077
- Video Recordings Act 1984 (Scotland) (Commencement No.7) Order 1988 SI 1988/1079
- Offshore Installations (Safety Zones) Order 1988 SI 1988/1080
- Offshore Installations (Safety Zones) (No. 2) Order 1988 SI 1988/1081
- Crown Office (Forms and Proclamations Rules) Order 1988 SI 1988/1082
- Child Abduction and Custody (Parties to Conventions) (Amendment) (No. 2) Order 1988 SI 1988/1083
- Environment Protection (Overseas Territories) Order 1988 SI 1988/1084
- Merchant Shipping (Tonnage) (Overseas Territories) Order 1988 SI 1988/1085
- Merchant Shipping Act 1970 (Overseas Territories) Order 1988 SI 1988/1086
- Employment and Training (Amendment) (Northern Ireland) Order 1988 SI 1988/1087
- Lord Chancellor's Salary Order 1988 SI 1988/1088
- Terms of Employment of Pilots (Arbitration) Regulations 1988 SI 1988/1089
- Veterinary Surgery (Blood Sampling) (Amendment) Order 1988 SI 1988/1090
- Social Work (Residential Establishments-Child Care) (Scotland) Amendment Regulations 1988 SI 1988/1091
- Residential Care Order (Secure Accommodation) (Scotland) Amendment Regulations 1988 SI 1988/1092
- Local Government Reorganisation (Property) (Tyne and Wear) Order 1988 SI 1988/1093
- Sutton District Water Order 1988 SI 1988/1094
- Ministry of Defence Police (Police Committee) Regulations 1988 SI 1988/1098
- Ministry of Defence Police (Representation at Disciplinary Proceedings) Regulations 1988 SI 1988/1099
- Industrial Training Orders (Amendment) Order 1988 SI 1988/1100

=== 1101–1200 ===
- Heavy Goods Vehicles (Drivers' Licences) (Amendment) (No. 2) Regulations 1988 SI 1988/1101
- Road Vehicles (Construction and Use) (Amendment) (No. 2) Regulations 1988 SI 1988/1102
- Motor Vehicles (Type Approval) (Amendment) Regulations 1988 SI 1988/1103
- Public Service Vehicles (Drivers' Licences) (Amendment) (No. 2) Regulations 1988 SI 1988/1104
- Northern Ireland (Emergency Provisions) Act 1987 (Commencement No. 2) Order 1988 SI 1988/1105
- National Health Service (General Medical and Pharmaceutical Services) Amendment Regulations 1988 SI 1988/1106
- Civil Legal Aid (Scotland) (Fees) Amendment SI 1988/1107
- Legal Aid (Scotland) (Fees in Civil Proceedings) Amendment (No.2) Regulations 1988 SI 1988/1108
- Criminal Legal Aid (Scotland) (Fees) Amendment (No.2) Regulations 1988 SI 1988/1109
- Legal Advice and Assistance (Scotland) Amendment Regulations 1988 SI 1988/1110
- Legal Aid (Scotland) (Fees in Criminal Proceedings) Amendment (No.2) Regulations 1988 SI 1988/1111
- Trade Marks and Service Marks (Amendment) Rules 1988 SI 1988/1112
- Merchant Shipping (Medical Stores) (Amendment) Regulations 1988 SI 1988/1116
- Employment Act 1988 (Commencement No. 1) Order 1988 SI 1988/1118
- Prosecution of Offences Act 1985 (Specified Proceedings) (Amendment) Order 1988 SI 1988/1121
- Funds for Trade Union Ballots (Amendment) Regulations 1988 SI 1988/1123
- Value Added Tax (Special Provisions) (Amendment) Order 1988 SI 1988/1124
- Farm Business Non-Capital Grant Scheme 1988 SI 1988/1125
- Criminal Legal Aid (Scotland) Amendment Regulations 1988 SI 1988/1126
- Customs Duties (Quota Relief) Order 1988 SI 1988/1127
- Measuring Instruments (EEC Requirements) (Amendment) Regulations 1988 SI 1988/1128
- Dartford-Thurrock Crossing Act 1988 (Appointed Day) Order 1988 SI 1988/1129
- Road Vehicles (Registration and Licensing) (Amendment) Regulations (Northern Ireland) 1988 SI 1988/1130
- Advice and Assistance (Scotland) Amendment (No.2) Regulations 1988 SI 1988/1131
- Home-Grown Cereals Authority (Rate of Levy) Order 1988 SI 1988/1132
- Immigration Act 1988 (Commencement No. 1) Order 1988 SI 1988/1133
- Immigration (Restricted Right of Appeal against Deportation) (Exemption) Order 1988 SI 1988/1134
- Pilotage Act 1987 (Commencement No. 3) Order 1988 SI 1988/1137
- Air Navigation (Restriction of Flying) (Nuclear Installations) Regulations 1988 SI 1988/1138
- Building Societies (Commercial Assets and Services) Order 1988 SI 1988/1141
- Building Societies (Limits on Commercial Assets) Order 1988 SI 1988/1142
- Land Registration (Scotland) Amendment Rules 1988 SI 1988/1143
- Central Manchester Development Corporation (Area and Constitution) Order 1988 SI 1988/1144
- Leeds Development Corporation (Area and Constitution) Order 1988 SI 1988/1145
- Sheffield Development Corporation (Area and Constitution) Order 1988 SI 1988/1146
- Wolverhampton Urban Development Area Order 1988 SI 1988/1147
- Building Societies (Transfer of Business) Regulations 1988 SI 1988/1153
- Crown Office (Preparation and Authentication of Documents Rules) Order 1988 SI 1988/1162
- St. Mary's Music School (Aided Places) Amendment Regulations 1988 SI 1988/1163
- Education (Assisted Places) (Scotland) Amendment Regulations 1988 SI 1988/1164
- Public Utility Transfers and Water Charges Act 1988 (Commencement No. 2) Order 1988 SI 1988/1165
- National Savings Bank (Amendment) Regulations 1988 SI 1988/1166
- Post Office Register (Trustee Savings Banks) (Revocation) Regulations 1988 SI 1988/1167
- Trustee Savings Banks Act 1985 (Appointed Day) (No. 6) Order 1988 SI 1988/1168
- Vaccine Damage Payments (Amendment) Regulations 1988 SI 1988/1169
- Transport Act 1981 (Commencement No. 13) Order 1988 SI 1988/1170
- Civil Legal Aid (Scotland) Amendment (No.2) Regulations 1988 SI 1988/1171
- London—Birmingham Trunk Road (A41) (M25 Interchange) (Trunking and De-trunking) Order 1988 SI 1988/1172
- A405 Trunk Road (Bricket Wood Junction) (Trunking) Order 1988 SI 1988/1173
- Value Added Tax (Goods Imported for Private Purposes) Relief Order 1988 SI 1988/1174
- Church of England (Legal Aid) Rules 1988 SI 1988/1175
- A127 London—Southend Trunk Road (Rayleigh Weir Improvement) Slip Roads Order 1988 SI 1988/1176
- Road Vehicles (Construction and Use) (Amendment) (No. 3) Regulations 1988 SI 1988/1177
- Road Vehicles (Construction and Use) (Amendment) (No. 4) Regulations 1988 SI 1988/1178
- Unitary Development Plans (Merseyside) (Appointed Day) Order 1988 SI 1988/1179
- Pig Carcase (Grading) Regulations 1988 SI 1988/1180
- Northern Ireland Act 1974 (Interim Period Extension) Order 1988 SI 1988/1181
- Measuring Instruments (EEC Requirements) (Fees) Regulations 1988 SI 1988/1184
- Pupils' Registration (Amendment) Regulations 1988 SI 1988/1185
- Licensing (Fees) (Amendment) Order 1988 SI 1988/1186
- Licensing Act 1988 (Commencement No. 1) Order 1988 SI 1988/1187
- Licensing (Extended Hours Orders) (Amendment) Rules 1988 SI 1988/1188
- Nursing Homes and Mental Nursing Homes (Amendment) Regulations 1988 SI 1988/1191
- Residential Care Homes (Amendment) Regulations 1988 SI 1988/1192
- Value Added Tax (Imported Goods) Relief (Amendment) Order 1988 SI 1988/1193
- Building Societies (Designation of Qualifying Bodies) Order 1988 SI 1988/1196
- Building Societies (Limits on Lending) Order 1988 SI 1988/1197
- Blood Tests (Evidence of Paternity) (Amendment) Regulations 1988 SI 1988/1198
- Town and Country Planning (Assessment of Environmental Effects) Regulations 1988 SI 1988/1199
- Police and Criminal Evidence Act 1984 (Codes of Practice) Order 1988 SI 1988/1200

=== 1201–1300 ===
- Agriculture Improvement (Amendment) Regulations 1988 SI 1988/1201
- Immigration (Restricted Right of Appeal against Deportation) (Exemption) (No. 2) Order 1988 SI 1988/1203
- Meters (Determination of Questions) (Expenses) Regulations 1988 SI 1988/1206
- Environmental Assessment (Afforestation) Regulations 1988 SI 1988/1207
- Education (Assisted Places) (Amendment) Regulations 1988 SI 1988/1210
- Education (Assisted Places) (Incidental Expenses) (Amendment) Regulations 1988 SI 1988/1211
- Education (Grants) (Music and Ballet Schools) (Amendment) Regulations 1988 SI 1988/1212
- Petroleum (Production) (Seaward Areas) Regulations 1988 SI 1988/1213
- Education Support Grants (Amendment) Regulations 1988 SI 1988/1214
- Wireless Telegraphy (Citizens' Band and Amateur Apparatus) (Various Provisions) Order 1988 SI 1988/1215
- Wireless Telegraphy (Control of Interference from Citizens' Band Radio Apparatus) (Amendment) Regulations 1988 SI 1988/1216
- Land Drainage Improvement Works (Assessment of Environmental Effects) Regulations 1988 SI 1988/1217
- Environmental Assessment (Salmon Farming in Marine Waters) Regulations 1988 SI 1988/1218
- British Waterways Board (Rateable Values) (Scotland) Amendment Order 1988 SI 1988/1219
- Docks and Harbours (Rateable Values) (Scotland) Amendment Order 1988 SI 1988/1220
- Environmental Assessment (Scotland) Regulations 1988 SI 1988/1221
- Health and Safety (Training for Employment) Regulations 1988 SI 1988/1222
- Bournemouth and District Water Company (Amendment of Local Enactments) Order 1988 SI 1988/1224
- Newcastle and Gateshead Water (Birch Trees No. 3 Spring) Order 1988 SI 1988/1225
- Social Security Act 1988 (Commencement No. 2) Order 1988 SI 1988/1226
- Child Benefit (General) Amendment Regulations 1988 SI 1988/1227
- Income Support (General) Amendment No. 3 Regulations 1988 SI 1988/1228
- Income Support (Transitional) Regulations 1988 SI 1988/1229
- Social Security (Credits) Amendment (No. 2) Regulations 1988 SI 1988/1230
- Submarine Pipe-lines (Designated Owners) (No. 13) Order 1988 SI 1988/1232
- Submarine Pipe-lines (Designated Owners) (No. 14) Order 1988 SI 1988/1233
- Submarine Pipe-lines (Designated Owners) (No. 15) Order 1988 SI 1988/1234
- Submarine Pipe-lines (Designated Owners) (No. 16) Order 1988 SI 1988/1235
- Submarine Pipe-lines (Designated Owners) (No. 17) Order 1988 SI 1988/1236
- Submarine Pipe-lines (Designated Owners) (No. 18) Order 1988 SI 1988/1237
- Submarine Pipe-lines (Designated Owners) (No. 19) Order 1988 SI 1988/1238
- Homes Insulation Grants Order 1988 SI 1988/1239
- Assured Tenancies (Approved Bodies) (Amendment) Order 1988 SI 1988/1240
- Highways (Assessment of Environmental Effects) Regulations 1988 SI 1988/1241
- Gipsy Encampments (District of Lewes) Order 1988 SI 1988/1242
- Town and Country Planning (General Development) (Scotland) Amendment (No.2) Order 1988 SI 1988/1249
- Gaming (Amendment) Act 1986 (Commencement) Order 1988 SI 1988/1250
- Gaming (Records of Cheques) Regulations 1988 SI 1988/1251
- Redundant Mineworkers and Concessionary Coal (Payments Schemes) (Amendment) Order 1988 SI 1988/1252
- London—Penzance Trunk Road A30 (Penhale to Carland Cross Improvement and Slip Roads) Order 1988 SI 1988/1256
- London-Penzance Trunk Road A30 (Penhale to Carland Cross Improvement) (Detrunking) Order 1988 SI 1988/1257
- Housing (Contributions Towards Expenditure for Area Improvement) Order 1988 SI 1988/1258
- Customs Duties (Spain and Portugal) (Revocation) Order 1988 SI 1988/1259
- Customs Duties (Portugal) Order 1988 SI 1988/1260
- Customs Duties (Spain) Order 1988 SI 1988/1261
- Children and Young Persons (Amendment) Act 1986 (Commencement No. 1) Order 1988 SI 1988/1262
- Grants by Local Housing Authorities (Eligible Expense Limits) Order 1988 SI 1988/1263
- Sole (Specified Sea Areas) (Prohibition of Fishing) Order 1988 SI 1988/1264
- Housing (Right to Buy) (Prescribed Forms) (Welsh Forms) Regulations 1988 SI 1988/1265
- Cereals Co-responsibility Levy (Certified Seed Exemption) Regulations 1988 SI 1988/1267
- Smoke Control Areas (Authorised Fuels) (Scotland) Regulations 1988 SI 1988/1270
- Electricity (Miscellaneous Pension Schemes) (Winding Up) Regulations 1988 SI 1988/1271
- Town and Country Planning General Development (Amendment) Order 1988 SI 1988/1272
- Ecclesiastical Judges and Legal Officers (Fees) Order 1988 SI 1988/1273
- Merchant Shipping (Weighing of Goods Vehicles and other Cargo) Regulations 1988 SI 1988/1275
- Estate Duty (Interest on Unpaid Duty) Order 1988 SI 1988/1276
- Estate Duty (Northern Ireland) (Interest on Unpaid Duty) Order 1988 SI 1988/1277
- Income Tax (Interest on Unpaid Tax and Repayment Supplement) (No. 2) Order 1988 SI 1988/1278
- Income Tax (Official Rate of Interest on Beneficial Loans) (No. 2) Order 1988 SI 1988/1279
- Inheritance Tax and Capital Transfer Tax (Interest on Unpaid Tax) Order 1988 SI 1988/1280
- Stamp Duty Reserve Tax (Interest on Tax Repaid) (No.2) Order 1988 SI 1988/1281
- Value Added Tax (Training) Order 1988 SI 1988/1282
- Landlord and Tenant Act 1987 (Commencement No. 3) Order 1988 SI 1988/1283
- Service Charge Contributions (Authorised Investments) Order 1988 SI 1988/1284
- Service Charge (Estimates and Consultation) Order 1988 SI 1988/1285
- Rate Support Grant (Scotland) Order 1988 Approved by the House of Commons SI 1988/1286
- Road Vehicles (Construction and Use) (Amendment) (No.5) Regulations 1988 SI 1988/1287
- Water (Meters) (Amendment) Regulations 1988 SI 1988/1288
- Farm Woodland Scheme 1988 SI 1988/1291
- Food Protection (Emergency Prohibitions) (England) Amendment No.3 Order 1988 SI 1988/1292
- Army, Air Force and Naval Discipline Acts (Continuation) Order 1988 SI 1988/1293
- Naval Medical Compassionate Fund (Amendment) Order 1988 SI 1988/1294
- Service Departments Registers (Amendment) Order 1988 SI 1988/1295
- Antarctic Treaty (Agreed Measures) (No. 2) Order 1988 SI 1988/1296
- Copyright (Singapore) (Amendment) Order 1988 SI 1988/1297
- EUMETSAT (Immunities and Privileges) Order 1988 SI 1988/1298
- EUTELSAT (Immunities and Privileges) Order 1988 SI 1988/1299
- Multilateral Investment Guarantee Agency (Overseas Territories) (Amendment) Order 1988 SI 1988/1300

=== 1301–1400 ===
- Appropriation (No. 2) (Northern Ireland) Order 1988 SI 1988/1301
- Farm Businesses (Northern Ireland) Order 1988 SI 1988/1302
- Sex Discrimination (Northern Ireland) Order 1988 SI 1988/1303
- Reciprocal Enforcement of Foreign Judgments (Canada) (Amendment) Order 1988 SI 1988/1304
- General Optical Council (Contact Lens (Qualifications etc.) Rules) Order of Council 1988 (SI 1988/1305)
- Local Government Administration (Matters Subject to Investigation) (Scotland) Order 1988 (SI 1988/1306)
- Copyright (International Conventions) (Amendment No. 2) Order 1988 (SI 1988/1307)
- Black Country Development Corporation (Vesting of Land) (Borough of Sandwell) Order 1988 (SI 1988/1308)
- Black Country Development Corporation (Vesting of Land) (Borough of Walsall) Order 1988 (SI 1988/1309)
- Black Country Development Corporation (Vesting of Land) (British Railways Board) Order 1988 (SI 1988/1310)
- Black Country Development Corporation (Vesting of Land) (Central Electricity Generating Board) Order 1988 (SI 1988/1311)
- Black Country Development Corporation (Vesting of Land) (General) Order 1988 (SI 1988/1312)
- Tyne and Wear Development Corporation (Vesting of Land) (Port of Tyne Authority) Order 1988 (SI 1988/1313)
- Customs Duties (ECSC) (Amendment No. 2) Order 1988 (SI 1988/1314)
- Tyne and Wear Development Corporation (Vesting of Land) (British Coal Corporation) Order 1988 (SI 1988/1315)
- Tyne and Wear Development Corporation (Vesting of Land) (British Shipbuilders and British Steel Corporation) Order 1988 SI 1988/1316
- Black Country Development Corporation (Vesting of Land) (British Steel Corporation) Order 1988 SI 1988/1317
- Tyne and Wear Development Corporation (Vesting of Land) (City of Newcastle upon Tyne) Order 1988 SI 1988/1318
- Tyne and Wear Development Corporation (Vesting of Land) (Various Local Authorities) Order 1988 SI 1988/1319
- Tyne and Wear Development Corporation (Vesting of Land) (Borough of Sunderland) Order 1988 SI 1988/1320
- Tyne and Wear Development Corporation (Vesting of Land) (Tyne and Wear Passenger Transport Executive) Order 1988 SI 1988/1321
- Crown Court (Amendment) (No. 2) Rules 1988 SI 1988/1322
- Public Charitable Collections (Scotland) Amendment Regulations 1988 SI 1988/1323
- Furniture and Furnishings (Fire) (Safety) Regulations 1988 SI 1988/1324
- Parochial Fees Order 1988 SI 1988/1327
- Matrimonial Causes (Costs) Rules 1988 SI 1988/1328
- Food Protection (Emergency Prohibitions) (Wales) (No. 5) Amendment No. 3 Order 1988 SI 1988/1329
- Licensing Act 1988 (Commencement No. 2) Order 1988 (SI 1988/1333)
- Companies (Disclosure of Information) (Designated Authorities) Order 1988 SI 1988/1334
- London Government Reorganisation (Property) Order 1988 SI 1988/1335
- Harbour Works (Assessment of Environmental Effects) Regulations 1988 SI 1988/1336
- Licensing (Special Hours Certificates) (Amendment) Rules 1988 SI 1988/1338
- Police Pensions (Amendment) Regulations 1988 SI 1988/1339
- Rules of the Supreme Court (Amendment No. 2) 1988 SI 1988/1340
- Administration of Justice Act 1985 (Commencement No. 5) Order 1988 SI 1988/1341
- Reimbursement of Costs (Monetary Limit) Order 1988 SI 1988/1342
- Value Added Tax (Repayment Supplement) Regulations 1988 SI 1988/1343
- Building Societies (Prescribed Contracts) Order 1988 SI 1988/1344
- Bovine Spongiform Encephalopathy (Amendment) Order 1988 SI 1988/1345
- Bovine Spongiform Encephalopathy Compensation Order 1988 SI 1988/1346
- Income Tax (Interest Relief) (Housing Associations) Regulations 1988 SI 1988/1347
- Personal Equity Plan (Amendment No. 2) Regulations 1988 SI 1988/1348
- Textile Products (Determination of Composition) (Amendment) Regulations 1988 SI 1988/1349
- Textile Products (Indications of Fibre Content) (Amendment) Regulations 1988 SI 1988/1350
- A47 Leicester—Great Yarmouth Trunk Road (Norwich Southern Bypass and Slip Roads) (Western Section) Order 1988 SI 1988/1351
- Set-Aside Regulations 1988 SI 1988/1352
- Food Protection (Emergency Prohibitions) Amendment No.2 Order 1988 SI 1988/1353
- Finance Act 1988 (Repayment Supplement) (Appointed Day) Order 1988 SI 1988/1354
- National Savings Stock Register (Amendment) Regulations 1988 SI 1988/1355
- Premium Savings Bonds (Amendment) Regulations 1988 SI 1988/1356
- Savings Certificates (Yearly Plan) (Amendment) Regulations 1988 SI 1988/1357
- Savings Contracts (Amendment) Regulations 1988 SI 1988/1358
- Companies (Forms) (Amendment) Regulations 1988 SI 1988/1359
- Education (Mandatory Awards) Regulations 1988 SI 1988/1360
- Legal Aid Act 1988 (Commencement No. 1) Order 1988 (SI 1988/1361)
- Fire Services (Appointments and Promotion) (Amendment) (No. 2) Regulations 1988 SI 1988/1362
- Social Security (Contribution Conditions for Unemployment and Sickness Benefit) Transitional Regulations 1988 SI 1988/1363
- Dartford—Thurrock Crossing Tolls Order 1988 SI 1988/1364
- Education (Welsh Medium Teacher Training Incentive Supplement) Regulations 1988 SI 1988/1365
- Cable Programme Services (Exceptions) Order 1988 SI 1988/1370
- Local Government Act 1988 (Defined Activities) (Competition) (England) Regulations 1988 SI 1988/1371
- Local Government Act 1988 (Defined Activities) (Exemptions) (England) Order 1988 SI 1988/1372
- Local Government Act 1988 (Defined Activities) (Specified Periods) (England) Regulations 1988 SI 1988/1373
- Teachers' Superannuation (Amendment) Regulations 1988 SI 1988/1374
- British Steel Act 1988 (Appointed Day) Order 1988 (SI 1988/1375)
- British Steel Act 1988 (Nominated Company) Order 1988 (SI 1988/1376)
- Statutory Water Companies (Occupational Pension Schemes) Regulations 1988 SI 1988/1377
- Pesticides (Maximum Residue Levels in Food) Regulations 1988 SI 1988/1378
- Welsh Water Authority (Extension of Operation of Byelaws) Order 1988 (SI 1988/1380)
- Sheriffs' Fees (Amendment) Order 1988 SI 1988/1384
- Public Record Office (Fees) Regulations 1988 SI 1988/1385
- A406 London North Circular Trunk Road (East London River Crossing (A13 to A2) Supplementary Trunk Road and Slip Roads) Order 1988 SI 1988/1386
- A406 London North Circular Trunk Road (East London River Crossing (A13 to A2) Trunk Road and Slip Roads) Order 1988 SI 1988/1387
- Legal Aid Act 1988 (Commencement No. 2) (Scotland) Order 1988 (SI 1988/1388)
- Advice and Assistance (Scotland) (Prospective Cost) Regulations 1988 SI 1988/1389
- Advice and Assistance (Assistance by Way of Representation) (Scotland) Amendment Regulations 1988 SI 1988/1390
- Education (Fees and Awards) (Amendment) Regulations 1988 SI 1988/1391
- State Awards (Amendment) Regulations 1988 SI 1988/1392
- Building Societies (Designation of Qualifying Bodies) (Amendment) Order 1988 SI 1988/1393
- Building Societies (Guernsey and Alderney) Order 1988 SI 1988/1394
- Royal Marines Terms of Service Regulations 1988 SI 1988/1395
- Merchant Shipping (Health and Safety: General Duties) (Amendment) Regulations 1988 SI 1988/1396
- Education (Bursaries for Teacher Training) Regulations 1988 SI 1988/1397
- Farm Diversification Grant (Variation) Scheme 1988 SI 1988/1398
- Black Country Development Corporation (Planning Functions) (Wolverhampton) Order 1988 SI 1988/1399
- Town and Country Planning (Wolverhampton Urban Development Area) Special Development Order 1988 SI 1988/1400

=== 1401–1500 ===
- British Shipbuilders Borrowing Powers (Increase of Limit) Order 1988 SI 1988/1401
- Criminal Justice Act 1988 (Commencement No. 1) Order 1988 SI 1988/1408
- Social Security (Employment Training: Payments) Order 1988 SI 1988/1409
- Peterborough Development Corporation (Transfer of Property and Dissolution) Order 1988 SI 1988/1410
- Local Government Act 1988 (Defined Activities) (Competition) (Scotland) Regulations 1988 SI 1988/1413
- Local Government Act 1988 (Defined Activities) (Specified Periods) (Scotland) Regulations 1988 SI 1988/1414
- Local Government Act 1988 (Defined Activities) (Exemptions) (Scotland) Order 1988 SI 1988/1415
- Gaming (Records of Cheques) (Scotland) Regulations 1988 SI 1988/1416
- Judicial Pensions (Personal Pension Option) Regulations 1988 SI 1988/1417
- Judicial Pensions (Preservation of Benefits) Order 1988 SI 1988/1418
- Judicial Pensions (Preserved Benefits and Personal Pension Option) Order 1988 SI 1988/1419
- Judicial Pensions (Requisite Benefits) Order 1988 SI 1988/1420
- Prison (Amendment) (No. 3) Rules 1988 SI 1988/1421
- Young Offender Institution Rules 1988 SI 1988/1422
- Education Authority Bursaries (Scotland) Amendment Regulations 1988 SI 1988/1423
- Students' Allowances (Scotland) Amendment Regulations 1988 SI 1988/1424
- National Health Service (Payments for Optical Appliances) (Scotland) Amendment (No.3) Regulations 1988 SI 1988/1425
- Import and Export (Plant Health Fees) (England and Wales) Order 1988 SI 1988/1427
- Agricultural Holdings (Units of Production) Order 1988 SI 1988/1428
- National Health Service (Payments for Optical Appliances) Amendment (No. 3) Regulations 1988 SI 1988/1435
- Occupational Pension Schemes (Transitional Provisions) Regulations 1988 SI 1988/1436
- Personal Pension Schemes (Provisional Approval) (Amendment) Regulations 1988 SI 1988/1437
- Family Credit (General) Amendment No. 3 Regulations 1988 SI 1988/1438
- Social Security (Credits) Amendment (No. 3) Regulations 1988 SI 1988/1439
- A12 Trunk Road (Leyton Way, Waltham Forest) (Prescribed Routes) Order 1988 SI 1988/1443
- Housing Benefit (General) Amendment No. 3 Regulations 1988 SI 1988/1444
- Income Support (General) Amendment No. 4 Regulations 1988 SI 1988/1445
- Social Security (Overlapping Benefits) Amendment Regulations 1988 SI 1988/1446
- Central Institutions (Recognition) (Scotland) Regulations 1988 SI 1988/1447
- Dundee College of Technology (Change of Name) Regulations 1988 SI 1988/1448
- Napier College of Commerce and Technology (Change of Name) Regulations 1988 SI 1988/1449
- Diseases of Animals (Approved Disinfectants) (Amendment) (No. 2) Order 1988 SI 1988/1453
- National Health Service (General Medical and Pharmaceutical Services) (Scotland) Amendment (No.2) Regulations 1988 SI 1988/1454
- Local Government Finance Act 1988 Commencement (Scotland) Order 1988 SI 1988/1456
- Gipsy Encampments (City of Durham) Order 1988 SI 1988/1458
- Education Reform Act 1988 (Commencement No. 1) Order 1988 SI 1988/1459
- Control of Industrial Major Accident Hazards (Amendment) Regulations 1988 SI 1988/1462
- Industrial Training Levy (Clothing and Allied Products) Order 1988 SI 1988/1463
- Liquor Licensing (Fees) (Scotland) Order 1988 SI 1988/1464
- East of Birmingham — Birkenhead Trunk Road (A41 Handley Bypass) Order 1988 SI 1988/1466
- Grants by Local Housing Authorities (Eligible Expense Limits) (No. 2) Order 1988 SI 1988/1467
- Local Government Act 1988 (Defined Activities) (Competition) (Wales) Regulations 1988 SI 1988/1468
- Local Government Act 1988 (Defined Activities) (Exemptions) (Wales) Order 1988 SI 1988/1469
- Local Government Act 1988 (Defined Activities) (Specified Periods) (Wales) Regulations 1988 SI 1988/1470
- Education (Parental Ballots for Acquisition of Grant-maintained Status) (Prescribed Body) Regulations 1988 SI 1988/1474
- Grants by Local Housing Authorities (Appropriate Percentage and Exchequer Contributions) (No. 2) Order 1988 SI 1988/1475
- Customs and Excise (Common Transit) Regulations 1988 SI 1988/1476
- Abolition of Domestic Rates (Domestic and Part Residential Subjects) (Scotland) Regulations 1988 SI 1988/1477
- Goods Vehicles (Plating and Testing) Regulations 1988 SI 1988/1478
- Berry Head and Berry Head (Southern Redoubt) (Areas of Special Protection) (Amendment) Order 1988 SI 1988/1479
- Whitehaven (Pilotage) Harbour Revision Order 1988 SI 1988/1480
- Offshore Installations (Safety Zones) (No. 3) Order 1988 SI 1988/1481
- Offshore Installations (Safety Zones) (Amendment) Order 1988 SI 1988/1482
- Housing Benefit (Social Security Act 1986 Modifications) (Scotland) Regulations 1988 SI 1988/1483
- Food (Meat Inspection) (Scotland) Regulations 1988 SI 1988/1484
- Merchant Shipping (Fees) Regulations 1988 SI 1988/1485
- International Bank for Reconstruction and Development (1988 General Capital Increase) Order 1988 SI 1988/1486
- Export of Goods (Control) (Amendment) Order 1988 SI 1988/1487
- Dock Workers (Regulation of Employment) (Amendment) Order 1988 SI 1988/1492
- Mersey Docks and Harbour Revision Order 1988 SI 1988/1493
- Fishguard (Pilotage) Harbour Revision Order 1988 SI 1988/1494
- Penzance and Newlyn (Pilotage) Harbour Revision Order 1988 SI 1988/1495
- Teignmouth (Pilotage) Harbour Revision Order 1988 SI 1988/1496
- Shoreham (Pilotage) Harbour Revision Order 1988 SI 1988/1497
- Port of Ramsgate (Pilotage) Harbour Revision Order 1988 SI 1988/1499
- St Ives (Pilotage) Harbour Revision Order 1988 SI 1988/1500

=== 1501–1600 ===
- Police (Scotland) Amendment Regulations 1988 (SI 1988/1501)
- Act of Sederunt (Fees of Sheriff Officers) 1988 (SI 1988/1502)
- Act of Sederunt (Fees of Messengers-at-Arms) 1988 (SI 1988/1503)
- A47 Trunk Road (Castor and Ailsworth Bypass and Slip Roads) Order 1988 (SI 1988/1509)
- A47 Trunk Road (Detrunking at Castor and Ailsworth) Order 1988 (SI 1988/1510)
- A1400 Trunk Road (Woodford Avenue Service Road, Redbridge) (Prescribed Routes) Order 1988 (SI 1988/1514)
- Education (Publication of Proposals for Reduction in Standard Number) Regulations 1988 (SI 1988/1515)
- West Strathclyde Protection Order 1988 (SI 1988/1516)
- Irvine (Pilotage Powers) Order 1988 (SI 1988/1517)
- Fowey Harbour, Par and Charlestown (Application of Pilotage Act 1987) Order 1988 (SI 1988/1518)
- Portsmouth Mile End Quay Harbour Revision Order 1988 (SI 1988/1519)
- Local Government Act 1988 (Defined Activities) (Specified Periods) (Wales) (Amendment) Regulations 1988 (SI 1988/1520)
- Act of Sederunt (Rules of the Court of Session Amendment No.4) (Commercial Actions) 1988 (SI 1988/1521)
- Motor Vehicles (Type Approval) (Great Britain) (Amendment) Regulations 1988 (SI 1988/1522)
- Motor Vehicles (Type Approval for Goods Vehicles) (Great Britain) (Amendment) Regulations 1988 (SI 1988/1523)
- Road Vehicles (Construction and Use) (Amendment) (No. 6) Regulations 1988 (SI 1988/1524)
- A406 London North Circular Trunk Road (Popes Lane (B4491) to Western Avenue (A40) Improvement, Trunk Road) Order 1988 (SI 1988/1525)
- A406 London North Circular Trunk Road (Popes Lane (B4491) to Western Avenue (A40) Improvement, Detrunking) Order 1988 (SI 1988/1526)
- The Uttlesford (Parishes) Order 1988 (SI 1988/1528)
- Local Government (Prescribed Expenditure) (Amendment) (No. 2) Regulations 1988 (SI 1988/1534)
- A3 Trunk Road (Roehampton Vale, Wandsworth) (Prescribed Routes) Order 1988 (SI 1988/1535)
- Community Water Charges (Scotland) Regulations 1988 (SI 1988/1538)
- Community Charges (Registration) (Scotland) (No.2) Regulations 1988 (SI 1988/1539)
- Standard and Collective Community Charges (Scotland) Amendment Regulations 1988 (SI 1988/1540)
- Personal Community Charge (Exemption for the Severely Mentally Impaired) (Scotland) Regulations 1988 (SI 1988/1541)
- London Government Reorganisation (Staff Compensation) Order 1988 (SI 1988/1542)
- Social Security (Credits) Amendment (No. 4) Regulations 1988 (SI 1988/1545)
- Public Health (Infectious Diseases) Regulations 1988 (SI 1988/1546)
- Merchant Shipping (Medical Stores) (Fishing Vessels) Regulations 1988 (SI 1988/1547)
- (A16) Norman Cross—Grimsby Trunk Road (Louth Bypass) Order 1988 (SI 1988/1548)
- (A16) Norman Cross—Grimsby Trunk Road (Louth Bypass) (Detrunking) Order 1988 (SI 1988/1549)
- Public Health (Notification of Infectious Diseases) (Scotland) Regulations 1988 (SI 1988/1550)
- Leeds Development Corporation (Planning Functions) Order 1988 (SI 1988/1551)
- Central Manchester Development Corporation (Planning Functions) Order 1988 (SI 1988/1552)
- Sheffield Development Corporation (Planning Functions) Order 1988 (SI 1988/1553)
- Submarine Pipe-lines (Designated Owners) (No. 20) Order 1988 (SI 1988/1554)
- Submarine Pipe-lines (Designated Owners) (No. 21) Order 1988 (SI 1988/1555)
- Submarine Pipe-lines (Designated Owners) (No. 22) Order 1988 (SI 1988/1556)
- Submarine Pipe-lines (Designated Owners) (No. 23) Order 1988 (SI 1988/1557)
- Submarine Pipe-lines (Designated Owners) (No. 24) Order 1988 (SI 1988/1558)
- Submarine Pipe-lines (Designated Owners) (No. 25) Order 1988 (SI 1988/1559)
- Submarine Pipe-lines (Designated Owners) (No. 26) Order 1988 (SI 1988/1560)
- Submarine Pipe-lines (Designated Owners) (No. 27) Order 1988 (SI 1988/1561)
- Transfrontier Shipment of Hazardous Waste Regulations 1988 (SI 1988/1562)
- Block Grant (Education Adjustments) (England) (Amendment) Regulations 1988 (SI 1988/1563)
- Criminal Justice Act 1987 (Commencement No. 3) Order 1988 (SI 1988/1564)
- Agricultural or Forestry Tractors and Tractor Components (Type Approval) Regulations 1988 (SI 1988/1567)
- The Sedgemoor (Parishes) Order 1988 (SI 1988/1572)
- London—Fishguard Trunk Road (A48) (Cross Hands Industrial Site Interchange, Slip Roads Trunking) Order 1988 (SI 1988/1583)
- Electro-medical Equipment (EEC Requirements) Regulations 1988 (SI 1988/1586)
- Energy Act 1983 (Commencement No. 2) Order 1988 (SI 1988/1587)
- Tyne and Wear Residuary Body (Winding Up) Order 1988 (SI 1988/1590)
- Anglian Water Authority (Cringle Brook) Water Order 1988 (SI 1988/1591)
- Hartlepools Water (Leechmire Borehole) Order 1988 (SI 1988/1592)
- London—Penzance Trunk Road A303 (Mere—Wincanton Improvement and Slip Road) Order 1988 (SI 1988/1593)
- London—Penzance Trunk Road A303 (Mere—Wincanton Improvement) (Detrunking) Order 1988 (SI 1988/1594)
- A523 Derby—Macclesfield—South of Stockport Trunk Road (Macclesfield Relief Road) No. 2 Order 1988 (SI 1988/1596)
- A523 Derby—Macclesfield—South of Stockport Trunk Road (Macclesfield Relief Road) (Detrunking) Order 1988 (SI 1988/1597)
- Consumer Arbitration Agreements Act 1988 (Appointed Day No. 1) Order 1988 (SI 1988/1598)

=== 1601–1700 ===
- Gaming Machine Licence Duty Regulations 1988 SI 1988/1602
- Treasury Bills (Amendment) Regulations 1988 SI 1988/1603
- Smoke Control Areas (Authorised Fuels) Regulations 1988 SI 1988/1607
- Community Charges (Registration) (Scotland) (No.2) Amendment Regulations 1988 SI 1988/1611
- Tyne and Wear Residuary Body (Winding Up) (Amendment) Order 1988 SI 1988/1615
- Teachers' Superannuation (Scotland) Amendment Regulations 1988 SI 1988/1618
- Estate Duty (Interest on Unpaid Duty) (No. 2) Order 1988 SI 1988/1619
- Estate Duty (Northern Ireland) (Interest on Unpaid Duty) (No. 2) Order 1988 SI 1988/1620
- Income Tax (Interest on Unpaid Tax and Repayment Supplement) (No. 3) Order 1988 SI 1988/1621
- Income Tax (Official Rate of Interest on Beneficial Loans) (No. 3) Order 1988 SI 1988/1622
- Inheritance Tax and Capital Transfer Tax (Interest on Unpaid Tax) (No. 2) Order 1988 SI 1988/1623
- Stamp Duty Reserve Tax (Interest on Tax Repaid) (No. 3) Order 1988 SI 1988/1624
- County Council of the Royal County of Berkshire (Blakes Bridge Reconstruction Reading) Scheme 1987 Confirmation Instrument 1988 SI 1988/1625
- Port of London (Pilotage) Harbour Revision Order 1988 SI 1988/1626
- Portsmouth (Pilotage) Harbour Revision Order 1988 SI 1988/1627
- Silloth (Pilotage) Harbour Revision Order 1988 SI 1988/1628
- Workington (Pilotage) Harbour Revision Order 1988 SI 1988/1629
- Beverages of an Alcoholic Strength not exceeding 5.5 per cent. (Provisions) (Appointed Day) Order 1988 SI 1988/1634
- Crown Court (Amendment) (No. 3) Rules 1988 SI 1988/1635
- Merchant Shipping (Guarding of Machinery and Safety of Electrical Equipment) Regulations 1988 SI 1988/1636
- Merchant Shipping (Means of Access) Regulations 1988 SI 1988/1637
- Merchant Shipping (Entry into Dangerous Spaces) Regulations 1988 SI 1988/1638
- Merchant Shipping (Hatches and Lifting Plant) Regulations 1988 SI 1988/1639
- Motorcycles (Sound Level Measurement Certificates) (Amendment) Regulations 1988 SI 1988/1640
- Merchant Shipping (Safe Movement on Board Ship) Regulations 1988 SI 1988/1641
- Environmentally Sensitive Areas (Breckland and Suffolk River Valleys) Designation (Amendment) Order 1988 SI 1988/1645
- Assured Tenancies (Approved Bodies) (No. 3) Order 1988 SI 1988/1646
- Ceramic Ware (Safety) Regulations 1988 SI 1988/1647
- Wireless Telegraphy (Cordless Telephone Apparatus) (Exemption) Regulations 1988 SI 1988/1648
- Teachers' Superannuation (Consolidation) Regulations 1988 SI 1988/1652
- Lyon Court and Office Fees (Variation) Order 1988 SI 1988/1653
- Transfer of Offenders (Designation of Equivalent Sentences) (Amendment) Order 1988 SI 1988/1654
- Docks Regulations 1988 SI 1988/1655
- Loading and Unloading of Fishing Vessels Regulations 1988 SI 1988/1656
- Control of Substances Hazardous to Health Regulations 1988 SI 1988/1657
- London-Fishguard Trunk Road (Haverfordwest Eastern By-pass) Order 1988 SI 1988/1664
- Petty Sessional Divisions (Oxfordshire) Order 1988 SI 1988/1665
- Northern Ireland (Share of United Kingdom Taxes) (Amendment) Regulations 1988 SI 1988/1667
- Welsh Water Authority (Fixed Engine) Order 1988 SI 1988/1668
- Motor Vehicles (Type Approval) (Amendment) (No. 2) Regulations 1988 SI 1988/1669
- Licensing (Retail Sales) Act 1988 (Commencement) Order 1988 SI 1988/1670
- Registered Establishments (Fees) (Scotland) Order 1988 SI 1988/1671
- Registration of Establishments (Appeal Tribunal) (Scotland) Amendment Rules 1988 SI 1988/1672
- Registration of Establishments (Application Form) (Scotland) Order 1988 SI 1988/1673
- Social Security (Unemployment, Sickness and Invalidity Benefit) Amendment (No. 2) Regulations 1988 SI 1988/1674
- Food Protection (Emergency Prohibitions) Amendment No.3 Order 1988 SI 1988/1675
- Criminal Justice Act 1988 (Commencement No. 2) Order 1988 SI 1988/1676
- Mostyn Docks Harbour Empowerment Order 1988 SI 1988/1677
- Export of Sheep (Prohibition) (No. 2) Amendment No. 3 Order 1988 SI 1988/1678
- Food Protection (Emergency Prohibitions) (England) Amendment No. 4 Order 1988 SI 1988/1679
- Food Protection (Emergency Prohibitions) (Wales) (No. 5) Amendment No. 4 Order 1988 SI 1988/1680
- Protected Tenancies (Exceptions) (Amendment) Regulations 1988 SI 1988/1683
- Alcoholic Liquor Duties (Beer-based Beverages) Order 1988 SI 1988/1684
- A106 Trunk Road (Church Lane, Waltham Forest) (Restriction of Use of Gap in Central Reservation) Order 1988 SI 1988/1685
- Criminal Justice Act 1987 (Notice of Transfer) Regulations 1988 SI 1988/1691
- District of South Somerset (Electoral Arrangements) Order 1988 SI 1988/1692
- Merchant Shipping (Stability of Passenger Ships) Regulations 1988 SI 1988/1693
- Criminal Justice Act 1987 (Dismissal of Transferred Charges) Rules 1988 SI 1988/1695
- Petty Sessions Areas (Divisions and Names) Regulations 1988 SI 1988/1698
- Criminal Justice Act 1987 (Preparatory Hearings) Rules 1988 SI 1988/1699
- Criminal Justice Act 1987 (Preparatory Hearings) (Interlocutory Appeals) Rules 1988 SI 1988/1700

=== 1701–1800 ===
- Magistrates' Courts (Notices of Transfer) Rules 1988 SI 1988/1701
- Bideford (Pilotage) Harbour Revision Order 1988 SI 1988/1702
- Cattewater (Pilotage) Harbour Revision Order 1988 SI 1988/1703
- Lowestoft (Pilotage) Harbour Revision Order 1988 SI 1988/1704
- Port of Wisbech (Pilotage) Harbour Revision Order 1988 SI 1988/1706
- Weymouth and Portland (Pilotage) Harbour Revision Order 1988 SI 1988/1707
- M66 Motorway (Manchester Outer Ring Road, Denton to Middleton Section) and Connecting Roads Scheme 1988 SI 1988/1708
- Criminal Justice (Scotland) Act 1987 (Commencement No. 6) Order 1988 SI 1988/1710
- Caernarfon (Pilotage) Harbour Revision Order 1988 SI 1988/1711
- Central Institutions (Scotland) Regulations 1988 SI 1988/1715
- Merchant Shipping (Operations Book) Regulations 1988 SI 1988/1716
- Petty Sessional Divisions (Kent) Order 1988 SI 1988/1717
- Home Purchase Assistance (Recognised Lending Institutions) (No. 2) Order 1988 SI 1988/1723
- Social Fund Cold Weather Payments (General) Regulations 1988 SI 1988/1724
- Social Security (Common Provisions) Miscellaneous Amendment Regulations 1988 SI 1988/1725
- Housing (Right to Buy) (Priority of Charges) (No. 2) Order 1988 SI 1988/1726
- Mortgage Indemnities (Recognised Bodies) (No. 2) Order 1988 SI 1988/1727
- M66 Motorway (Middleton to the Lancashire/Yorkshire Motorway (M62) Section) and Connecting Roads Scheme 1988 SI 1988/1728
- Mines (Safety of Exit) Regulations 1988 SI 1988/1729
- River Tummel Catchment Area Protection (Renewal) Order 1988 SI 1988/1733
- River Lunan Catchment Area Protection (Renewal) Order 1988 SI 1988/1734
- Self-Propelled Industrial Trucks (EEC Requirements) Regulations 1988 SI 1988/1736
- Borough of Blyth Valley (Electoral Arrangements) Order 1988 SI 1988/1737
- Indictments (Procedure) (Amendment) Rules 1988 SI 1988/1738
- Insolvency (Amendment) Regulations 1988 SI 1988/1739
- Submarine Pipe-lines (Designated Owners) (No. 28) Order 1988 SI 1988/1740
- Submarine Pipe-lines (Designated Owners) (No. 29) Order 1988 SI 1988/1741
- Submarine Pipe-lines (Designated Owners) (No. 30) Order 1988 SI 1988/1742
- Submarine Pipe-lines (Designated Owners) (No. 31) Order 1988 SI 1988/1743
- Submarine Pipe-lines (Designated Owners) (No. 32) Order 1988 SI 1988/1744
- Local Government Reorganisation (Property) (No.2) (West Yorkshire) Order 1988 SI 1988/1745
- Employment Protection (Medical Suspension) Order 1988 SI 1988/1746
- London Government Reorganisation (Mortgages) Order 1988 SI 1988/1747
- Rickmansworth Water Company (Repeal of Local Enactments) Order 1988 SI 1988/1758
- Seed Potatoes (Amendment) Regulations 1988 SI 1988/1759
- Spirits (Rectifying, Compounding and Drawback) Regulations 1988 SI 1988/1760
- Cod (Specified Sea Areas) (Prohibition of Fishing) (Variation) Order 1988 SI 1988/1761
- Police (Complaints) (General) (Amendment) Regulations 1988 SI 1988/1762
- Public Telecommunication System Designation (Cotswold Cable Television Company Limited) Order 1988 SI 1988/1763
- A13 Trunk Road (New Road, Havering) (Prescribed Routes) Order 1988 SI 1988/1766
- Trade Descriptions (Place of Production) (Marking) Order 1988 SI 1988/1771
- Foreign Prison-made Goods Act 1897 (Amendment) Regulations 1988 SI 1988/1772
- A11 Trunk Road (High Road, Leytonstone, Waltham Forest) (Prescribed Routes) Order 1988 SI 1988/1773
- Housing and Planning Act 1986 (Commencement No. 12) Order 1988 SI 1988/1787
- Fees for Inquiries (Standard Daily Amount) Regulations 1988 SI 1988/1788
- Local Government (Council of the Borough of Newport, Gwent, Library Authority) Order 1988 SI 1988/1789
- Control of Pollution (Special Waste) (Amendment) Regulations 1988 SI 1988/1790
- Education Reform Act 1988 (Commencement No.2) Order 1988 SI 1988/1794
- The Medina (Parish of Seaview) Order 1988 S.I. 1988/1795
- Nurses, Midwives and Health Visitors (Entry to Training Requirements) Amendment Rules Approval Order 1988 SI 1988/1798
- Education (Higher Education Corporations) Order 1988 SI 1988/1799
- Education (Higher Education Corporations) (No. 2) Order 1988 SI 1988/1800

=== 1801–1900 ===
- Education (Higher Education Corporations) (No.3) Order 1988 SI 1988/1801
- Importation of Milk Regulations 1988 SI 1988/1803
- Milk and Dairies (Semi-skimmed and Skimmed Milk) (Heat Treatment and Labelling) (Amendment) Regulations 1988 SI 1988/1804
- Milk (Special Designation) (Amendment) Regulations 1988 SI 1988/1805
- Fire Safety and Safety of Places of Sport Act 1987 (Commencement No. 4) Order 1988 SI 1988/1806
- Safety of Places of Sport Regulations 1988 SI 1988/1807
- Goods Vehicles (Authorisation of International Journeys) (Fees) (Amendment) Regulations 1988 SI 1988/1808
- Road Transport (International Passenger Services) (Amendment) Regulations 1988 SI 1988/1809
- Customs and Excise (Deferred Payment) (RAF Airfields and Offshore Installations) Regulations 1988 SI 1988/1810
- Goods Vehicles (Operators' Licences) (Temporary Use in Great Britain) (Amendment) Regulations 1988 SI 1988/1811
- Town and Country Planning (Applications) Regulations 1988 SI 1988/1812
- Town and Country Planning General Development Order 1988 SI 1988/1813
- Importation of Milk (Scotland) Regulations 1988 SI 1988/1814
- Milk and Dairies (Semi-skimmed and Skimmed Milk) (Heat Treatment and Labelling) (Scotland) Amendment Regulations 1988 SI 1988/1815
- Milk (Special Designations) (Scotland) Amendment Order 1988 SI 1988/1816
- Criminal Justice Act 1988 (Commencement No.3) Order 1988 SI 1988/1817
- Debtors (Scotland) Act 1987 (Commencement No.2) Order 1988 SI 1988/1818
- Law Reform (Miscellaneous Provisions) (Scotland) Act 1985 (Commencement No.4) Order 1988 SI 1988/1819
- Police Cadets (Amendment) (No. 2) Regulations 1988 SI 1988/1820
- Police (Amendment) (No. 2) Regulations 1988 SI 1988/1821
- European Parliamentary Elections (Day of Election) Order 1988 SI 1988/1822
- European Parliamentary Elections (Day of By-election) (Hampshire Central Constituency) Order 1988 SI 1988/1823
- Patents, Designs and Marks Act 1986 (Commencement No. 2) Order 1988 SI 1988/1824
- Land Registration (District Registries) Order 1988 SI 1988/1825
- (A650) North-West of Doncaster—Kendal Trunk Road (Drighlington Bypass) Order 1988 SI 1988/1826
- (A650) North-West of Doncaster—Kendal Trunk Road (Bradford District Boundary to Gildersome Interchange De-Trunking) Order 1988 SI 1988/1827
- London—Great Yarmouth Trunk Road (A12) (Cambridge Park Detrunking) Order 1988 SI 1988/1828
- London—Great Yarmouth Trunk Road (A12) (Eastway to Eastern Avenue and Slip Roads at Wanstead) Variation Order 1988 SI 1988/1829
- London—Great Yarmouth Trunk Road (A12) (Eastway to Eastern Avenue Section) (Green Man Interchange Slip Roads) Order 1988 SI 1988/1830
- London—Great Yarmouth Trunk Road (A12) (Eastway to Eastern Avenue Section) (Lea Interchange Slip Roads) Order 1988 SI 1988/1831
- London—Great Yarmouth Trunk Road (A106) Detrunking Order 1988 SI 1988/1832
- London—Norwich Trunk Road (A11) (Leytonstone Road and High Road Leytonstone Detrunking) Order 1988 SI 1988/1833
- A102(M) Motorway (Eastway Section) No. 2 Scheme 1988 SI 1988/1834
- A102(M) Motorway (Eastway Section) Connecting Roads Scheme 1988 SI 1988/1835
- Transfer of Functions (British Museum (Natural History)) Order 1988 SI 1988/1836
- Local Authorities (Armorial Bearings) Order 1988 SI 1988/1837
- Bermuda (Territorial Sea) Order in Council 1988 SI 1988/1838
- Child Abduction and Custody (Parties to Conventions) (Amendment) (No. 3) Order 1988 SI 1988/1839
- Merchant Shipping (Prevention of Oil Pollution) (Hong Kong) (Amendment) Order 1988 SI 1988/1840
- Merchant Shipping Act 1988 (Cayman Islands) Order 1988 SI 1988/1841
- St. Helena Constitution Order 1988 SI 1988/1842
- Transfer of Functions (Health and Social Security) Order 1988 SI 1988/1843
- Corneal Tissue (Northern Ireland) Order 1988 SI 1988/1844
- Criminal Justice (Firearms) (Northern Ireland) Order 1988 SI 1988/1845
- Criminal Justice (Serious Fraud) (Northern Ireland) Order 1988 SI 1988/1846
- Criminal Justice (Evidence, Etc.) (Northern Ireland) Order 1988 SI 1988/1847
- Fuel and Electricity (Control) Act 1973 (Continuation) (Jersey) Order 1988 SI 1988/1848
- Malicious Communications (Northern Ireland) Order 1988 SI 1988/1849
- Merchant Shipping Act 1965 (Guernsey) Order 1988 SI 1988/1850
- Merchant Shipping Act 1979 (Guernsey) Order 1988 SI 1988/1851
- Scotch Whisky (Northern Ireland) Order 1988 SI 1988/1852
- Reciprocal Enforcement of Foreign Judgments (Canada) (Amendment) (No. 2) Order 1988 SI 1988/1853
- Registration of Title (No. 2) Order 1988 SI 1988/1854
- Copyright (International Conventions) (Amendment No. 3) Order 1988 SI 1988/1855
- Patents, Designs and Marks (Guinea-Bissau and Malaysia) (Convention and Relevant Countries) Order 1988 SI 1988/1856
- Social Security Act 1988 (Commencement No. 3) Order 1988 SI 1988/1857
- Industrial Training Levy (Road Transport) Order 1988 SI 1988/1858
- Nursing Homes Registration (Scotland) Regulations 1988 SI 1988/1861
- Crown Prosecution Service (Witnesses' etc. Allowances) Regulations 1988 SI 1988/1862
- Serious Fraud Office (Witnesses' etc. Allowances) Regulations 1988 SI 1988/1863
- Exeter — Launceston — Bodmin Trunk Road A30 (Plusha to Bolventor Improvement) (Detrunking) Order 1988 SI 1988/1867
- Exeter—Launceston—Bodmin Trunk Road A30 (Plusha to Bolventor Improvement and Slip Roads) Order 1988 SI 1988/1869
- Road Vehicles (Construction and Use) (Amendment) (No. 7) Regulations 1988 SI 1988/1871
- The Cannock Chase District Order 1987 (Variation of Supplementary Provision) 1988 S.I. 1988/1872
- Renfrew and Cunninghame Districts (Whitehouse) Boundaries Amendment Order 1988 SI 1988/1877 (S. 173)
- Three Valleys Water Order 1988 SI 1988/1878
- Public Service Vehicles (Registration of Local Services) (Amendment) Regulations 1988 SI 1988/1879
- Community Charges (Levying, Collection and Payment) (Scotland) Regulations 1988 SI 1988/1880
- Food Protection (Emergency Prohibitions) Amendment No. 4 Order 1988 SI 1988/1881
- Import and Export (Plant Health Fees) (Scotland) Order 1988 SI 1988/1882
- Family Law (Scotland) Act 1985 (Commencement No.2) Order 1988 SI 1988/1887
- Education (Higher Education Corporations) (Amendment) Order 1988 SI 1988/1888
- Community Charges (Information Concerning Social Security) (Scotland) Regulations 1988 SI 1988/1889
- Housing Benefit (Community Charge Rebates) (Scotland) Regulations 1988 SI 1988/1890
- Civil Legal Aid (Scotland) Amendment (No.3) Regulations 1988 SI 1988/1891
- Court of Session Etc. Fees Amendment (No.3) Order 1988 SI 1988/1892
- Sheriff Court Fees Amendment (No.2) Order 1988 SI 1988/1893
- Motor Vehicles (Tests) (Amendment) (No. 3) Regulations 1988 SI 1988/1894
- Customs and Excise (Deferred Payment) (RAF Airfields and Offshore Installations) (No. 2) Regulations 1988 SI 1988/1898
- Merchant Shipping (Protection of Shipping and Trading Interests) (USSR) (Revocation) Order 1988 SI 1988/1899
- Submarine Pipe-lines (Designated Owners) (No. 33) Order 1988 SI 1988/1900

=== 1901–2000 ===
- Submarine Pipe-lines (Designated Owners) (No. 34) Order 1988 SI 1988/1901
- Submarine Pipe-lines (Designated Orders) (No.35) Order 1988 SI 1988/1902
- Submarine Pipe-lines (Designated Owners) (No. 36) Order 1988 SI 1988/1903
- Non-Domestic Rates (Scotland) Regulations 1988 SI 1988/1904
- Training Commission (Incidental and Transitional Provisions) Order 1988 SI 1988/1905
- Penalty Points (Alteration) Order 1988 SI 1988/1906
- Merchant Shipping Act 1988 (Commencement No. 2) Order 1988 SI 1988/1907
- Social Fund Cold Weather Payments (General) Amendment Regulations 1988 SI 1988/1908
- Merchant Shipping (Fishing Vessels—Tonnage) Regulations 1988 SI 1988/1909
- Merchant Shipping (Tonnage) (Amendment) Regulations 1988 SI 1988/1910
- Merchant Shipping (Transitional Provisions — Fishing Vessels) Order 1988 SI 1988/1911
- Petty Sessional Divisions (Warwickshire) Order 1988 SI 1988/1912
- Rivers Tweed and Eye Protection (Renewal) Order 1988 SI 1988/1913
- Merchant Shipping (Registration of Fishing Vessels) Regulations 1988 SI 1988/1926
- Sutton Harbour Revision Order 1988 SI 1988/1928
- Merchant Shipping (Fees) (Amendment) Regulations 1988 SI 1988/1929
- Quarries (Explosives) Regulations 1988 SI 1988/1930
- Scottish Land Court (Fees) Amendment Rules 1988 SI 1988/1933
- National Health Service (Payments for Optical Appliances) Amendment (No. 4) Regulations 1988 SI 1988/1935
- Police Pensions (Lump Sum Payments to Widows) Regulations 1988 SI 1988/1936
- Royal Irish Constabulary (Lump Sum Payments to Widows) Regulations 1988 SI 1988/1937
- Legal Aid (General) (Amendment) (No. 2) Regulations 1988 SI 1988/1938
- Southampton (Pilotage) Harbour Revision Order 1988 SI 1988/1940
- Port of Heysham (Pilotage) Harbour Revision Order 1988 SI 1988/1946
- Falmouth (Pilotage) Harbour Revision Order 1988 SI 1988/1947
- Wireless Telegraphy Apparatus (Approval) (Test Fees) Order 1988 SI 1988/1949
- National Health Service (Payments for Optical Appliances) (Scotland) Amendment (No.4) SI 1988/1950
- Rate Support Grant (Specified Bodies) Regulations 1988 SI 1988/1951
- Local Government Reorganisation (Miscellaneous Provision) Order 1988 SI 1988/1955
- National Health Service (Superannuation) (Scotland) Amendment Regulations 1988 SI 1988/1956
- Friendly Societies (Valuation) (Amendment) Regulations 1988 SI 1988/1959
- Financial Services Act 1986 (Commencement) (No. 10) Order 1988 SI 1988/1960
- Financial Services (Schemes Authorised in Designated Countries or Territories) (Notification) Regulations 1988 SI 1988/1961
- Income Tax (Interest Relief) (Qualifying Lenders) (No. 2) Order 1988 SI 1988/1962
- Local Government (Non-Domestic District Rates and District Community Charges) (Scotland) Regulations 1988 SI 1988/1963
- Insurance Brokers Registration Council (Registration and Enrolment) (Amendment) Rules Approval Order 1988 SI 1988/1964
- Merger Reference (Elders IXL Limited and Scottish & Newcastle Breweries plc) Order 1988 SI 1988/1965
- County of Gwent (Electoral Arrangements) Order 1988 SI 1988/1966
- Liverpool and Wirral Urban Development Area Order 1988 SI 1988/1967
- Merseyside Development Corporation (Planning Functions) (Liverpool and Wirral) Order 1988 SI 1988/1968
- Data Protection (Fees) Regulations 1988 SI 1988/1969
- Family Credit (General) Amendment No. 4 Regulations 1988 SI 1988/1970
- Housing Benefit (General) Amendment No. 4 Regulations 1988 SI 1988/1971
- A40 Trunk Road (Western Avenue, Ealing) (Prohibition of Left Turn) Order 1988 SI 1988/1972
- Mersey Docks and Harbour Revision (No. 2) Order 1988 SI 1988/1973
- Safety of Sports Grounds (Designation) Order 1988 SI 1988/1975
- Act of Sederunt (Small Claim Rules) 1988 SI 1988/1976
- Non-Domestic District Rates (Timetable) (Scotland) Regulations 1988 SI 1988/1977
- Act of Sederunt (Amendment of Sheriff Court Ordinary Cause, and Summary Cause, Rules) 1988 SI 1988/1978
- Legal Officers (Annual Fees) Order 1988 SI 1988/1979
- Patronage (Appeals) Rules 1988 SI 1988/1980
- Education (Grant-maintained Schools) (Termination of Power to Determine a Period of Suspension) Order 1988 SI 1988/1981
- Agriculture Improvement (Amendment) (No. 2) Regulations 1988 SI 1988/1982
- Agriculture Improvement (Variation) (No. 2) Scheme 1988 SI 1988/1983
- Transfer of Functions (Government Shareholding in British Airways Plc) Order 1988 SI 1988/1984
- Parliamentary Commissioner (No. 2) Order 1988 SI 1988/1985
- Consular Fees (Amendment) (No. 2) Order 1988 SI 1988/1986
- Criminal Evidence (Northern Ireland) Order 1988 SI 1988/1987
- Education (Academic Tenure) (Northern Ireland) Order 1988 SI 1988/1988
- Education (Unrecognised Degrees) (Northern Ireland) Order 1988 SI 1988/1989
- Housing (Northern Ireland) Order 1988 SI 1988/1990
- Merchant Shipping (Certification of Deck Officers and Marine Engineer Officers) (Guernsey) Order 1988 SI 1988/1991
- Parliamentary Constituencies (Scotland) (Miscellaneous Changes) Order 1988 SI 1988/1992
- Sheriff Courts (Scotland) Act 1971 (Privative Jurisdiction and Summary Cause) Order 1988 SI 1988/1993
- Air Navigation (Aeroplane and Aeroplane Engine Emission of Unburned Hydrocarbons) Order 1988 SI 1988/1994
- Payments to Redundant Churches Fund Order 1988 SI 1988/1995
- Benefices (Institution Appeals) Rules 1988 SI 1988/1996
- Small Claims (Scotland) Order 1988 SI 1988/1999
- Noise Insulation (Amendment) Regulations 1988 SI 1988/2000

=== 2001–2100 ===
- Merchant Shipping (Ships' Names) (Amendment) Regulations 1988 SI 1988/2001
- Education Reform Act 1988 (Commencement No. 3) Order 1988 SI 1988/2002
- Merchant Shipping (Fishing Vessels' Names) Regulations 1988 SI 1988/2003
- Petty Sessional Divisions (Berkshire) Order 1988 SI 1988/2008
- Act of Sederunt (Proceedings in the Sheriff Court under the Debtors (Scotland) Act 1987) 1988 SI 1988/2013
- Advice and Assistance (Scotland) (Prospective Cost) (No.2) Regulations 1988 SI 1988/2014
- Financial Services (Designated Countries and Territories) (Overseas Collective Investment Schemes) Order 1988 SI 1988/2015
- Medicines (Products Other Than Veterinary Drugs) (Prescription Only) Amendment Order 1988 SI 1988/2017
- Assured Tenancies (Approved Bodies) (No. 4) Order 1988 SI 1988/2018
- Criminal Justice Act 1988 (Offensive Weapons) Order 1988 SI 1988/2019
- Income Support (General) Amendment No. 5 Regulations 1988 SI 1988/2022
- Conservation of Seals (Common Seals) Order 1988 SI 1988/2023
- Conservation of Seals (England and Wales) Order 1988 SI 1988/2024
- Education (Listed Bodies) Order 1988 SI 1988/2034
- Education (Recognised Awards) Order 1988 SI 1988/2035
- Education (Recognised Bodies) Order 1988 SI 1988/2036
- Education Support Grants (Amendment) (No. 2) Regulations 1988 SI 1988/2037
- Housing (Scotland) Act 1988 Commencement Order 1988 SI 1988/2038
- Weights and Measures (Intoxicating Liquor) Order 1988 SI 1988/2039
- Weights and Measures (Miscellaneous Foods) Order 1988Approved by both Houses of ParliamentJ SI 1988/2040
- Consumer Protection Act 1987 (Commencement No. 2) Order 1988 SI 1988/2041
- Employment Act 1988 (Commencement No. 2) Order 1988 SI 1988/2042
- Passenger and Goods Vehicles (Recording Equipment) (Approval of Fitters and Workshops) (Fees) (Amendment) Regulations 1988 SI 1988/2043
- North Devon Link Road (Little Gornhay Junction Slip Roads) (Trunking) Order 1988 SI 1988/2044
- A1079 Trunk Road (Hull City Boundary to Barmston Drain) (De-Trunking) Order 1988 SI 1988/2045
- Shoreham Port Authority Harbour Revision Order 1988 SI 1988/2046
- Consumer Credit (Agreements and Cancellation Notices and Copies of Documents) (Amendment) Regulations 1988 SI 1988/2047
- Distress for Rent Rules 1988 SI 1988/2050
- Customs Duties (ECSC) (Amendment No. 3) Order 1988 SI 1988/2055
- Housing Act 1988 (Commencement No. 1) Order 1988 SI 1988/2056
- Housing (Right to Buy) (Designated Rural Areas and Designated Region) (England) Order 1988 SI 1988/2057
- Merger Reference (Strong & Fisher (Holdings) plc and Pittard Garnar plc) Order 1988 SI 1988/2058
- Act of Sederunt (Form of charge for payment) 1988 SI 1988/2059
- Act of Sederunt (Rules of the Court of Session Amendment No.5) (Time to pay directions) 1988 SI 1988/2060
- Merchant Shipping (Seamen's Wages and Accounts) (Fishing Vessels) (Amendment) Regulations 1988 SI 1988/2064
- Agriculture Improvement (Amendment) (No. 3) Regulations 1988 SI 1988/2065
- Agriculture Improvement (Variation) (No. 3) Scheme 1988 SI 1988/2066
- Assured Tenancies (Notices to Quit Prescribed Information) (Scotland) Regulations 1988 SI 1988/2067
- Assured Tenancies (Exceptions) (Scotland) Regulations 1988 SI 1988/2068
- Assured Tenancies (Tenancies at a Low Rent) (Scotland) Order 1988 SI 1988/2069
- Public Lending Right Scheme 1982 (Commencement of Variations) Order 1988 SI 1988/2070
- Cod (Specified Sea Areas) (Prohibition of Fishing) (Revocation) Order 1988 SI 1988/2071
- Employment Appeal Tribunal (Amendment) Rules 1988 SI 1988/2072
- Criminal Justice Act 1988 (Commencement No.4) Order 1988 SI 1988/2073
- Education (Amendment of the Teachers' Pay and Conditions Act 1987) Order 1988 SI 1988/2074
- Consumer Protection Act 1987 (Commencement No. 3) Order 1988 SI 1988/2076
- Registration of Births, Deaths and Marriages (Fees) (No. 2) Order 1988 SI 1988/2077
- Consumer Protection (Code of Practice for Traders on Price Indications) Approval Order 1988 SI 1988/2078
- Price Marking (Bargain Offers) (Revocation) Order 1988 SI 1988/2079
- Housing Revenue Account General Fund Contribution Limits (Scotland) Order 1988 SI 1988/2081
- Car Tax (Amendment) Regulations 1988 SI 1988/2082
- Value Added Tax (General) (Amendment) Regulations 1988 SI 1988/2083
- Sweeteners in Food (Scotland) Amendment Regulations 1988 SI 1988/2084
- Assured Tenancies (Rent Book) (Scotland) Regulations 1988 SI 1988/2085
- Landlord's Repairing Obligations (Specified Rent) (Scotland) Order 1988 SI 1988/2086
- Designs (Amendment) Rules 1988 SI 1988/2088
- Patents (Amendment) Rules 1988 SI 1988/2089
- Wireless Telegraphy (Reciprocal Exemption of European Radio Amateurs) Regulations 1988 SI 1988/2090
- Town and Country Planning General Development (Amendment) Order 1988 SI 1988/2091
- Acquisition of Land (Rate of Interest after Entry) (No. 2) Regulations 1988 SI 1988/2092
- Acquisition of Land (Rate of Interest after Entry) (Scotland) (No. 2) Regulations 1988 SI 1988/2093
- Opencast Coal (Rate of Interest on Compensation) (No. 2) Order 1988 SI 1988/2094
- Act of Sederunt (Messengers-at-Arms and Sheriff Officers Rules) 1988 SI 1988/2097
- Veterinary Surgeons and Veterinary Practitioners (Registration)(Amendment) Regulations Order of Council 1988 SI 1988/2099
- The Melton (Parishes) Order 1988 S.I. 1988/2100

=== 2101–2200 ===
- Lands Tribunal for Scotland (Amendment) (Fees) Rules 1988 SI 1988/2105
- Local Statutory Provisions (Postponement of Repeal) (Scotland) Order 1988 SI 1988/2106
- Health and Medicines Act 1988 (Commencement No. 1) Order 1988 SI 1988/2107
- Value Added Tax (General) (Amendment) (No. 2) Regulations 1988 SI 1988/2108
- Assured Tenancies (Forms) (Scotland) Regulations 1988 SI 1988/2109
- Butter (EEC Special Sale) (Revocation) SI 1988/2110
- Spring Traps Approval (Variation) Order 1988 SI 1988/2111
- Sweeteners in Food (Amendment) Regulations 1988 SI 1988/2112
- Medicines (Pharmacies) (Applications for Registration and Fees) Amendment Regulations 1988 SI 1988/2113
- Local Government Reorganisation (Property, etc.) (Greater Manchester) Order 1988 SI 1988/2114
- Birmingham—Great Yarmouth Trunk Road (A47) (Eye Bypass) Order 1988 SI 1988/2115
- Funds for Trade Union Ballots (Amendment No. 2) Regulations 1988 SI 1988/2116
- Trade Union Ballots and Elections (Independent Scrutineer Qualifications) Order 1988 SI 1988/2117
- Occupational Pensions (Revaluation) Order 1988 SI 1988/2118
- Social Security (Unemployment, Sickness and Invalidity Benefit) Amendment (No. 3) Regulations 1988 SI 1988/2119
- Weighing Equipment (Non-automatic Weighing Machines) (Amendment) Regulations 1988 SI 1988/2120
- Cosmetic Products (Safety) (Amendment No.2) Regulations 1988 SI 1988/2121
- Three-Wheeled All-Terrain Motor Vehicles (Safety)Regulations 1988 SI 1988/2122
- Mersey Docks and Harbour (Princes River Berth) Revision Order 1988 SI 1988/2124
- (A43) Oxford—Market Deeping Trunk Road (Blisworth and Milton Malsor Bypass and Slip Roads to Rothersthorpe Service Area) Order 1988 SI 1988/2125
- (A43) Oxford—Market Deeping Trunk Road (Blisworth and Milton Malsor Bypass and Slip Roads to Rothersthorpe Service Area) Detrunking Order 1988 SI 1988/2126
- M1 Motorway (Rothersthorpe Service Area Connecting Roads) Scheme 1988 SI 1988/2127
- Goods Vehicles (Operators' Licences, Qualifications and Fees) (Amendment) Regulations 1988 SI 1988/2128
- Education (NAB Staff) Order 1988 SI 1988/2129
- Civil Aviation (Route Charges for Navigation Services) (Fifth Amendment) Regulations 1988 SI 1988/2130
- Crown Court (Amendment) (No. 4) Rules 1988 SI 1988/2131
- Magistrates' Courts (Criminal Justice Act 1988) (Miscellaneous Amendments) Rules 1988 SI 1988/2132
- Air Navigation (Dangerous Goods) (Second Amendment) Regulations 1988 SI 1988/2133
- Agricultural Levies (Export Control) Regulations 1988 SI 1988/2135
- Medicines (Exemptions from Restrictions on the Retail Sale or Supply of Veterinary Drugs) (Amendment) (No. 2) Order 1988 SI 1988/2136
- Protection of Wrecks (Designation No. 2 Order 1984) (Amendment) Order 1988 SI 1988/2137
- Protection of Wrecks (Designation No. 1) Order 1988 SI 1988/2138
- National Savings Bank (Amendment) (No. 2) Regulations 1988 SI 1988/2144
- Income Tax (Reduced and Composite Rate) Order 1988 SI 1988/2145
- Rating Lists (Valuation Date) Order 1988 SI 1988/2146
- Financial Services (Designated Countries and Territories) (Overseas Collective Investment Schemes) (Guernsey) Order 1988 SI 1988/2148
- Financial Services (Designated Countries and Territories) (Overseas Collective Investment Schemes) (Jersey) Order 1988 SI 1988/2149
- Civil Aviation (Joint Financing) Regulations 1988 SI 1988/2151
- Housing Act 1988 (Commencement No. 2) Order 1988 SI 1988/2152
- London Regional Transport Levy (General Rate Act 1967) (Modification) Order 1988 SI 1988/2153
- Education (Schools and Further Education) (Amendment) Regulations 1988 SI 1988/2154
- Landlord's Repairing Obligations (Specified Rent) (Scotland) (No .2) Order 1988 SI 1988/2155
- Isles of Scilly (Pilotage) Harbour Revision Order 1988 SI 1988/2156
- Littlehampton (Pilotage) Harbour Revision Order 1988 SI 1988/2157
- Wells (Pilotage) Harbour Revision Order 1988 SI 1988/2158
- Criminal Appeal (Amendment) Rules 1988 SI 1988/2159
- Crown Court (Amendment) (No. 5) Rules 1988 SI 1988/2160
- Lotteries (Amendment) Regulations 1988 SI 1988/2161
- Police (Amendment) (No. 3) Regulations 1988 SI 1988/2162
- Police Cadets (Amendment) (No. 3) Regulations 1988 SI 1988/2163
- Civil Courts (Amendment) Order 1988 SI 1988/2165
- Act of Sederunt (Fees of Messengers-at-Arms) (No .2) 1988' SI 1988/2166
- Act of Sederunt (Fees of Sheriff Officers) (No.2) 1988 SI 1988/2167
- School Curriculum Development Committee and Secondary Examinations Council (Designation of Staff) Order 1988 SI 1988/2171
- School Curriculum Development Committee and Secondary Examinations Council (Transfer of Property) Order 1988 SI 1988/2172
- Valuation Timetable (Scotland) Amendment (No .2) Order 1988 SI 1988/2173
- Iron Casting (Scientific Research Levy) (Abolition) Order 1988 SI 1988/2177
- Merger Reference (Hillsdown Holdings plc and Pittard Garnar plc) Order 1988 SI 1988/2178
- Cumbria and Lancashire (County Boundaries) Order 1988 SI 1988/2179
- Cleveland and Durham (County Boundaries) Order 1988 SI 1988/2180
- Accommodation of Children (Charge and Control) Regulations 1988 SI 1988/2183
- Boarding-out of Children (Foster Placement) Regulations 1988 SI 1988/2184
- Income Tax (Interest on Unpaid Tax and Repayment Supplement) (No. 4) Order 1988 SI 1988/2185
- Income Tax (Official Rate of Interest on Beneficial Loans) (No. 4) Order 1988 SI 1988/2186
- Stamp Duty Reserve Tax (Interest on Tax Repaid) (No.4) Order 1988 SI 1988/2187
- Children and Young Persons (Amendment) Act 1986 (Commencement No. 2) Order 1988 SI 1988/2188
- Housing (Prescribed Forms) (Repair Notices etc.) Regulations 1988 SI 1988/2189
- Milk and Dairies (Semi-skimmed and Skimmed Milk) (Heat Treatment) (Scotland) Regulations 1988 SI 1988/2190
- Milk (Special Designations) (Scotland) Order 1988 SI 1988/2191
- Housing (Scotland) Act 1988 (Specified Date) Order 1988 SI 1988/2192
- Lotteries (Scotland) Amendment Regulations 1988 SI 1988/2193
- Building (Procedure) (Scotland) Amendment Regulations 1988 SI 1988/2194
- Rent Act 1977 (Forms etc.) (Amendment) Regulations 1988 SI 1988/2195
- Cod (Specified Sea Area) (Prohibition of Fishing) Order 1988 SI 1988/2196
- Plaice (Specified Sea Areas) (Prohibition of Fishing) Order 1988 SI 1988/2197
- Rent Book (Forms of Notice) (Amendment) Regulations 1988 SI 1988/2198
- Assured Tenancies and Agricultural Occupancies (Rent Information) Order 1988 SI 1988/2199
- Rent Assessment Committees (England and Wales) (Amendment) Regulations 1988 SI 1988/2200

=== 2201–2300 ===
- Notices to Quit etc. (Prescribed Information) Regulations 1988 SI 1988/2201
- Local Government Reorganisation (Capital Money) (Greater London) (Amendment) Order 1988 SI 1988/2202
- Assured Tenancies and Agricultural Occupancies (Forms) Regulations 1988 SI 1988/2203
- Milk (Special Designation) Regulations 1988 SI 1988/2204
- Milk and Dairies (Semi-skimmed and Skimmed Milk) (Heat Treatment and Labelling) Regulations 1988 SI 1988/2206
- The Windsor and Maidenhead (Parishes) Order 1988 S.I. 1988/2207
- Ministry of Defence Police (Defence Police Federation) Regulations 1988 SI 1988/2208
- Firearms (Amendment) Act 1988 (Commencement No. 1) Order 1988 SI 1988/2209
- Community Charges (Notification of Deaths) (Scotland) Regulations 1988 SI 1988/2211
- Value Added Tax (Imported Goods) Relief (Amendment) (No. 2) Order 1988 SI 1988/2212
- Spring Traps Approval (Scotland) Variation Order 1988 SI 1988/2213
- Registration of Births, Deaths, Marriages and Divorces (Fees) (Scotland) (No.2) Regulations 1988 SI 1988/2214
- Marriage Fees (Scotland) Regulations 1988 SI 1988/2215
- Statutory Harbour Undertakings (Pilotage Accounts) Regulations 1988 SI 1988/2216
- Value Added Tax (Repayment to Community Traders) (Amendment) Regulations 1988 SI 1988/2217
- Price Marking (Petrol) (Amendment) Order 1988 SI 1988/2226
- Employment Subsidies Act 1978 (Renewal) (Great Britain) Order 1988 SI 1988/2229
- Combined Probation Areas (Berkshire) Order 1988 SI 1988/2232
- Combined Probation Areas (Oxfordshire) Order 1988 SI 1988/2233
- Combined Probation Areas (Warwickshire) Order 1988 SI 1988/2234
- Fire Services (Appointments and Promotion) (Amendment) (No. 3) Regulations 1988 SI 1988/2235
- Assured and Protected Tenancies (Lettings to Students) Regulations 1988 SI 1988/2236
- Personal and Occupational Pension Schemes (Incentive Payments) Amendment Regulations 1988 SI 1988/2237
- Personal Pension Schemes (Compensation) Regulations 1988 SI 1988/2238
- Clergy Pensions (Amendment) Regulations 1988 SI 1988/2239
- European Communities (Designation) (No.2) Order 1988 SI 1988/2240
- Architects' Qualifications (EC Recognition) Order 1988 SI 1988/2241
- Criminal Justice Act 1988 (Torture) (Overseas Territories) Order 1988 SI 1988/2242
- Extradition (Hijacking) (Amendment) Order 1988 SI 1988/2243
- Extradition (Internationally Protected Persons) (Amendment) Order 1988 SI 1988/2244
- Extradition (Protection of Aircraft) (Amendment) Order 1988 SI 1988/2245
- Extradition (Taking of Hostages) (Amendment) Order 1988 SI 1988/2246
- Extradition (Torture) Order 1988 SI 1988/2247
- Naval, Military and Air Forces etc. (Disablement and Death) Service Pensions Amendment (No. 2) Order 1988 SI 1988/2248
- Health and Medicines (Northern Ireland) Order 1988 SI 1988/2249
- Air Navigation (Fourth Amendment) Order 1988 SI 1988/2250
- Merchant Shipping (Categorisation of Registries of Overseas Territories) Order 1988 SI 1988/2251
- Merchant Shipping (Prevention of Pollution by Garbage) Order 1988 SI 1988/2252
- Ministerial and other Salaries Order 1988 SI 1988/2253
- Trustee Investments (Additional Powers) Order 1988 SI 1988/2254
- General Medical Council Preliminary Proceedings Committee and Professional Conduct Committee (Procedure) Rules Order of Council 1988 SI 1988/2255
- Church of England Pensions Regulations 1988 SI 1988/2256
- Customs Duties (ECSC) (Quota and Other Reliefs) Order 1988 SI 1988/2257
- Financial Services (Recognised Collective Investment Schemes from Other Member States) (Luxembourg) Order 1988 SI 1988/2258
- National Health Service (General Medical and Pharmaceutical Services) (Scotland) Amendment (No .3) Regulations 1988 SI 1988/2259
- Personal Injuries (Civilians) Amendment (No. 2) Scheme 1988 SI 1988/2260
- The Kettering (Parishes) Order 1988 S.I. 1988/2262
- Zoonoses Order 1988 SI 1988/2264
- National Health Service (General Dental Services) Amendment (No. 2) Regulations 1988 SI 1988/2265
- County of Dyfed (Electoral Arrangements) Order 1988 SI 1988/2266
- Use of Invalid Carriages on Highways Regulations 1988 SI 1988/2268
- Artificial Insemination (Cattle and Pigs) (Fees) (Amendment) Regulations 1988 SI 1988/2269
- Education Reform Act 1988 (Commencement No. 4) Order 1988 SI 1988/2271
- Merchant Shipping (Emergency Equipment Lockers for Ro/Ro Passenger Ships) Regulations 1988 SI 1988/2272
- Merchant Shipping (Safety at Work Regulations) (Non-UK Ships) Regulations 1988 SI 1988/2274
- Smoke Control Areas (Exempted Fireplaces) Order 1988 SI 1988/2282
- Education (Higher Education Corporations) (No. 4) Order 1988 SI 1988/2283
- Financial Services (Designated Countries and Territories) (Overseas Collective Investment Schemes) (Bermuda) Order 1988 SI 1988/2284
- Financial Services Act 1986 (Commencement) (No. 11) Order 1988 SI 1988/2285
- Hallmarking (International Convention) (Amendment) Order 1988 SI 1988/2286
- Police (Scotland) Amendment (No .2) Regulations 1988 SI 1988/2287
- Advice and Assistance (Scotland) (Prospective Cost) (No .3) Regulations 1988 SI 1988/2288
- Legal Aid (Scotland) Act 1986 Amendment Regulations 1988 SI 1988/2289
- Advice and Assistance (Assistance by Way of Representation) (Scotland) Regulations 1988 SI 1988/2290
- Consumer Arbitration Agreements Act 1988 (Appointed Day No. 2) Order 1988 SI 1988/2291
- Merchant Shipping (Prevention of Pollution by Garbage) Regulations 1988 SI 1988/2292
- Merchant Shipping (Reception Facilities for Garbage) Regulations 1988 SI 1988/2293
- Transport Act 1985 (Commencement No. 6) (Amendment) Order 1988 SI 1988/2294
- National Health Service (General Medical and Pharmaceutical Services) Amendment (No.2) Regulations 1988 SI 1988/2297
- Dover (Pilotage) Harbour Revision Order 1988 SI 1988/2298
- Bovine Spongiform Encephalopathy (No. 2) Order 1988 SI 1988/2299
- Sea Fishing (Enforcement of Community Conservation Measures) (Amendment) (No. 2) Order 1988 SI 1988/2300

=== 2301–2400 ===
- Sea Fishing (Enforcement of Community Quota Measures) Order 1988 (SI 1988/2301)
- Legal Aid in Criminal Proceedings (Costs) (Amendment) Regulations 1988 (SI 1988/2302)
- Legal Aid in Criminal Proceedings (General) (Amendment) (No. 2) Regulations 1988 (SI 1988/2303)
- Newport (Isle of Wight) Harbour Revision Order 1988 (SI 1988/2304)
- Eastbourne Water Order 1988 (SI 1988/2306)
- Army Long-Term Reserve Regulations 1988 (SI 1988/2311)

== See also ==
- List of statutory instruments of the United Kingdom
