= HIV/AIDS in New Zealand =

There is a relatively low prevalence of HIV/AIDS in New Zealand, with an estimated 3,272 people out of a population of 5 million living with HIV/AIDS as of 2023. The rate of newly diagnosed HIV infections was stable at around 200 annually through the late 1980s and the 1990s but rose sharply from 2000 to 2005. It has since stabilised at roughly 100 new cases annually. Male-to-male sexual contact has been the largest contributor to new HIV cases in New Zealand since record began in 1985. Heterosexual contact is the second largest contributor to new cases, but unlike male-to-male contact, they are mostly acquired outside New Zealand. In 2018 the New Zealand Government reported a "major reduction" in the number of people diagnosed with HIV.

World AIDS Day is observed in New Zealand.

== History ==
=== 1980s ===
The first recorded AIDS diagnosis in New Zealand happened in 1983. The first recorded death in New Zealand from AIDS-related conditions was 29 year old Denny in New Plymouth in April 1984, after returning from living in Sydney to be in care of his family. It was discovered in 1984 that HIV was identified as the causative agent to AIDS.

In 1985, HIV antibody tests to detect infection became available in New Zealand. In June 1985, Bruce Burnett, an advocate and educator for HIV and AIDS, died.

Eve van Grafhorst was ostracised in Australia since she had contracted HIV from a transfusion of infected blood. The family moved to New Zealand in 1986 where she died aged 11 in 1993. By the time of her death, her plight had significantly raised the level of AIDS awareness in New Zealand.

In 1986, Homosexual Law Reform Act 1986 passed, legalising that broadly legalised consensual sexual practices between men as well as consensual anal sex regardless of partners' gender. The HIV and AIDS was hot topic during the Homosexual Law Reform debates with some believing legalising homosexuality would spread HIV more, well others believe Homosexual Law Reform would make better healthcare and education available.

In 1987 Antiretroviral drugs became available; however, they were not common until the mid 1990s.

In 1988, New Zealand established the New Zealand Needle Exchange Programme (NZNEP), the first nationwide needle exchange programme legally sanctioned in the world. Created in response to the HIV/AIDS epidemic, NZNEP provided sterile needles and syringes to people who inject drugs. The programme operated with strong community involvement and harm reduction principles.

In 1988, the New Zealand AIDS Memorial Quilt was created with the "intention was to raise awareness and enable loved ones to express feelings of love, loss and regret in a permanent and tangible way." The Quilt concept originated in San Francisco in 1987 and is now known as the NAMES Project AIDS Memorial Quilt. On 5 October 1991, the Quilt was officially unveiled, in the presence of Governor General Dame Catherine Tizard.

=== 1990s ===
Between 1992 and 2001, the Hero Parade took place in Auckland, New Zealand, an annual gay and lesbian parade in Auckland, which was part of the Hero Festival. According to its original organisers, the Hero Parade was intended to foster a sense of community amongst LGBTQ people, and acknowledge those who were fighting HIV/AIDS.

In 1992, Mika X performed "Lava Lover" a powerful performance at the Hero Party in Princes Wharf in Auckland. The performance was themed surrounding gay rights as well as dedicating to people who died of AIDS. His backdrop was Keith Haring-inspired art with yellow squares with symbols of condoms and safe sex messaging. Mika who has had many friends and partners who has died from AIDS related deaths, has raised money throughout the 1980s and 1990s for HIV and AIDS initiatives.

In 1993, the Human Rights Act 1993 passed making it illegal to discriminate on the basis of the presence in the body of organisms capable of causing illness (a reference to HIV).

In 1996, University of Otago created AIDS Epidemiology Group or AEG to do surveillance on HIV, AIDS and AIDS related deaths.

In 1999, the first Big Gay Out event was held in Auckland, marking the beginning of what would become one of New Zealand's most prominent annual celebrations of the rainbow community. Organised by the New Zealand AIDS Foundation which is now known as the Burnett Foundation, the event was created to promote visibility, celebrate diversity, and raise awareness of HIV and STI prevention. Over the years, Big Gay Out became a key platform for public health campaigns targeting the LGBTQ+ community. These included initiatives such as Get it On!, Love Your Condom (LYC), and Ending HIV, all aimed at reducing stigma, encouraging condom use, and increasing HIV testing rates. The event combines entertainment, political engagement, and health promotion, and continues to draw thousands of attendees each year.

=== 2000s ===
On 6 October 2005 a New Zealand District Court ruled that HIV-positive people need not tell sexual partners about their status so long as safe sex is practiced. In the case being ruled on, the man had used a condom during intercourse but not during oral sex. His partner had not been infected. The same man was convicted of criminal nuisance earlier for having unprotected sex with another partner without revealing his HIV status.

In 2009, Glenn Mills faced 28 charges in the Auckland District Court relating to alleged intentional HIV transmission involving 14 individuals, in what became the largest HIV criminal prosecution in New Zealand's history. Mills, who was HIV-positive, was accused of engaging in unprotected sex without disclosing his status. While seven of the complainants were confirmed to have contracted HIV, the case gained widespread attention due to the scale and seriousness of the allegations. On 30 November 2009, Mills was found dead in his cell at Auckland’s Remand Centre at Mt Eden Prison, having died by suicide while awaiting trial. His death led to criticism of the Department of Corrections for its handling of his custody and mental health needs, and was later the subject of a coronial inquest.

=== 2010s ===
In 2015, the first Auckland’s Puawai Festival was held over a six day period to empower people living with HIV. The festival was a collaboration between Body Positive, Positive Women Inc, Borni Te Rongopai Tukiwaho and in the later events with the New Zealand Aids Foundation (now known as Burnett Foundation). The event came about when Body Positive approached Borni Te Rongopai Tukiwaho through performance and art. The festival was held annual, generally near World AIDS Day, however, the festival has not happened since the COVID-19 pandemic.

In 2017, the last known conviction in New Zealand for HIV transmission occurred, when a man was sentenced for infecting his partner. In 2018, the Court of Appeal reduced his sentence from four years and three months to three years and two months, citing his remorse and rehabilitation efforts.

In 2018, Body Positive introduced the Undetectable = Untransmittable (U = U) campaign to New Zealand. Body Positive has been a strong advocate for the U = U message, working to reduce stigma and improve public understanding of HIV transmission and treatment.

In 2019, Body Positive, New Zealand Aids Foundation and Positive Women Inc launched a sperm bank called Sperm Positive for HIV-positive people to donate. This is the first of its kind in the world, which received significant media attention across the world. On 27 January 2021, Amy was born who became the first ever baby to be born from a HIV sperm bank. As part of the Campaign, a picture book was released called The Baby who Changed the world. The campaign won a multiple awards at the Cannes Festival of Creativity.

In 2019, New Zealand was identified as one of the highest HIV criminalisation "hotspots," with an estimated 10 criminal cases per 10,000 diagnosed people living with HIV, ranking it third highest among surveyed countries.

=== 2020s ===
In 2022, it was reported that New Zealand recorded no AIDS-related deaths in 2021 for the first time since the beginning of the epidemic in the country.

In 2023, the New Zealand Government created the National HIV Action Plan which aims to reduce HIV transmission in New Zealand by 90% compared to 2010 levels by 2030.

== Organisations ==
The Ministry of Health is the government department which deals with health issues, including HIV/AIDS.

Body Positive Incorporated (established in 1980s) peer support organisation providing care and support to all people living with HIV/AIDS in New Zealand, as well as advocating and combat stigma surrounding HIV.

Burnett Foundation Aotearoa (formerly the New Zealand AIDS Foundation (NZAF)) is New Zealand's national HIV prevention and healthcare organisation. Its funding is derived from grants, donations and the Ministry of Health. The New Zealand AIDS Foundation changed its name to the Burnett Foundation Aotearoa in 2022 after Bruce Burnett. It is a registered charitable trust and has a focus on prevention of AIDS in the most at-risk group, namely men who have sex with men.

Positive Women Inc (established in 1990) peer support organisation providing care and support to women and heterosexual people living with HIV/AIDS in New Zealand, as well as advocating and combat stigma surrounding HIV. Te Taenga Mai is an umbrella brand under Positive Women which aims to provide HIV prevention and support in Aotearoa for migrants, refugees and asylum seekers. One of the service that Positive Women coordinate is the Positive speakers bureau. This service supplies businesses, health organisation and schools with HIV related education.

In 2008, The INA Foundation, a Kaupapa Māori organisation was created that supports HIV positive people named after Immanuel and Noelle who died as infants of HIV and Apihaka who lived despite both parents having HIV. Unfortunately the foundation has not been active since 2022.

In 2020, Toitū te Ao, another Kaupapa Māori organisation was created that supports HIV positive people, based in Waikato and Bay of Plenty.

Other places that support and inform are the New Zealand Prostitutes Collective and New Zealand Family Planning sexual health clinics. The New Zealand Prostitutes' Collective started in 1987 and in 1988 signed contract with the Ministry of Health with "a focus on HIV and Aids".

== Antiretroviral medications ==
The Pharmaceutical Management Agency (Pharmac) manages the national schedule of subsidised medications. As of 2014, twenty-one different antiretroviral medications were subsidised for people with confirmed HIV/AIDS or for post-exposure prophylaxis.

In March 2018, New Zealand became one of the first countries in the world to publicly fund pre-exposure prophylaxis medication for those at a high risk of contracting HIV.

== Number of people notified with HIV by year of diagnosis ==
Number of people notified with HIV by year of diagnosis, and since 2002, this includes both diagnosed within New Zealand and overseas.

Year	HIV Notifications total	Male AIDS diagnoses	Female AIDS Diagnoses	Number of AIDS related deaths
1985	60	12	0	5
1986	123	15	<5	11
1987	102	30	0	14
1988	92	44	0	24
1989	107	67	<5	52
1990	101	70	<5	60
1991	104	66	<5	52
1992	99	57	6	66
1993	80	50	<5	55
1994	83	45	<5	45
1995	80	62	<5	51
1996	92	58	5	33
1997	68	36	<5	34
1998	107	24	5	19
1999	120	29	10	18
2000	89	21	<5	19
2001	102	21	9	14
2002	136	15	5	11
2003	186	32	6	10
2004	183	32	12	13
2005	217	31	7	15
2006	204	20	8	15
2007	196	23	5	11
2008	222	34	5	8
2009	197	18	6	9
2010	180	29	<5	15
2011	140	20	<5	5
2012	168	25	7	9
2013	171	20	<5	11
2014	215	11	<5	11
2015	214	14	0	6
2016	244	18	<5	8
2017	196	13	<5	12
2018	187	20	<5	8
2019	210	17	<5	8
2020	163	12	<5	<5
2021	111	11	5	5
2022	137	19	<5	<5
2023	241	10	5	6
2024	277	25	<5	<5
2025	217	9	0	8

== Blood donation ==
The New Zealand Blood Service (NZBS), like many countries, controversially defers any man who has had oral or anal intercourse with another man, with or without protection, in the past three months from donating blood. (Before 14 December 2020, the deferral period was 12 months). The restriction is on the basis that men who have sex with men in New Zealand are 44 times more likely to be infected with HIV/AIDS than the general population, and the HIV testing used is not specific enough (up to 1 in 1000 failure rate) to guarantee a 100 percent HIV-free blood supply.

== See also ==
- List of Peer-led HIV testing organisations in New Zealand
- AIDS pandemic
