= Flatmate (disambiguation) =

A flatmate is a person who shares a flat.

Flatmate or flatmates may also refer to:

- Flatmate (film), development title for the film Sleep Tight
- Flatmates (British TV series), 2019 comedy-drama series
- Flatmates (New Zealand TV series), 1997 reality show
- The Flatmates, British indie pop band
