= Karanga (Māori culture) =

Element of cultural protocol in Māoridom

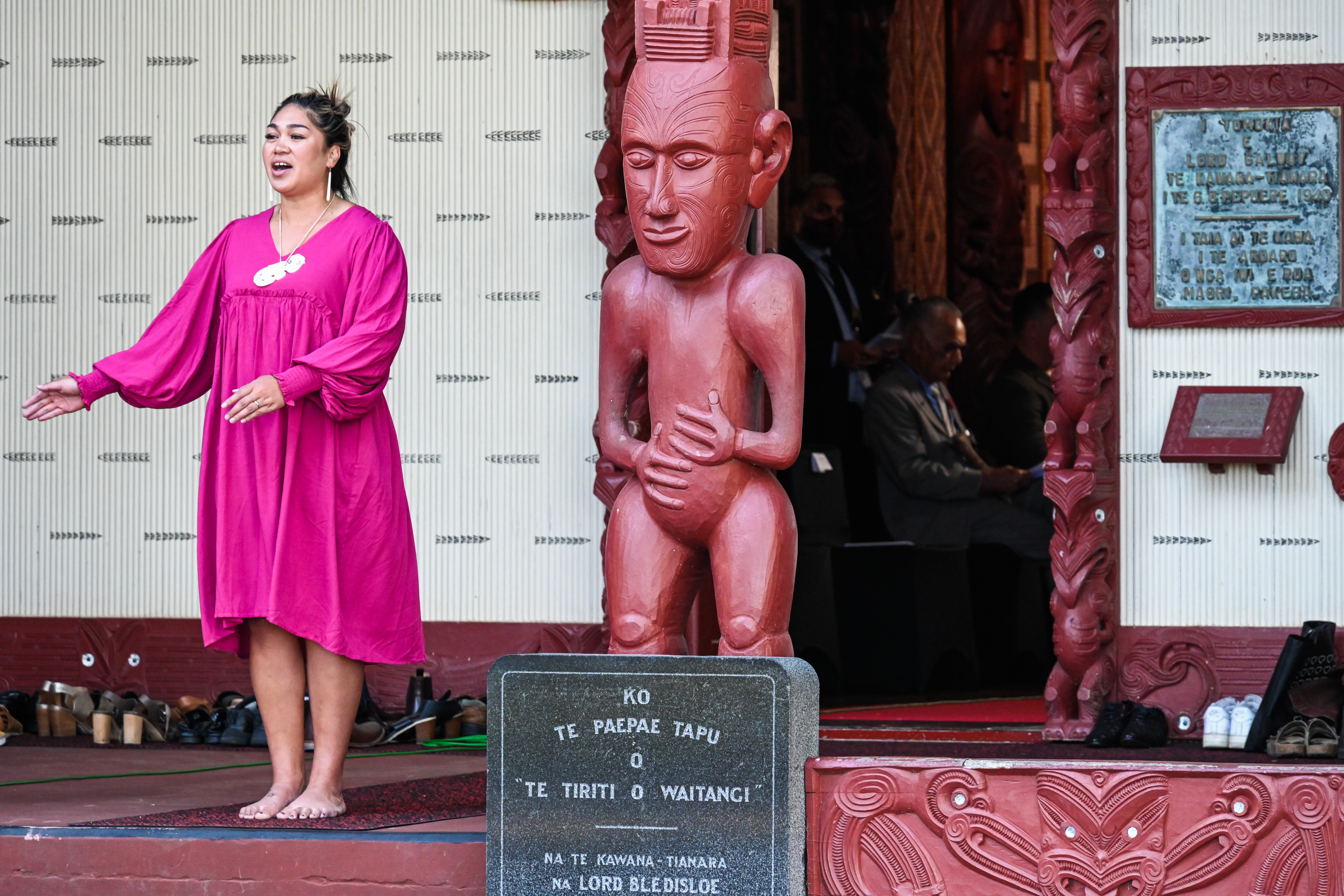
A woman performs a karanga during a pōwhiri at Te Whare Rūnanga on the Waitangi upper treaty grounds in January 2022

A karanga (call out, summon) is an element of cultural protocol of the Māori people of New Zealand. It is an exchange of calls that forms part of the pōwhiri, a Māori welcoming ceremony. It takes place as a visiting group moves onto the marae or into the formal meeting area. Karanga are carried out almost exclusively by women and in Māori language, and are initiated by the tangata whenua or hosts, and responded to by the visitors.

Karanga follow a particular format in keeping with protocol. This includes exchanging greetings, paying tribute to the dead (especially those who have most recently died), and referring to the reason for the groups' coming together. It has an important function in building connections between tangata whenua and manuhiri (guests), and setting the agenda for the gathering.

The karanga continuously strengthens the relationship between the physical and spiritual realms... (Hinematua McNeill and Sandy Hata, 2013)

== See also ==
- Karakia

== Sources ==
- Karanga - Korero Maori
- Audio recording, words and music notation of a karanga
- Definition of karakia in Te Papakupu o te Taitokerau on the website Te Māra Reo
