= Craig Johnson =

Craig Johnson may refer to:

== Entertainment ==
- Craig Johnson (author) (born 1961), American novelist and playwright
- Craig Johnson (director), American film director and screenwriter
- Craig Hella Johnson (born 1962), American choral conductor, composer and arranger

== Politics ==
- Craig Johnson (Alaska politician) (1953–2026), member of the Alaska House of Representatives
- Craig Johnson (Iowa politician) (born 1963), member of the Iowa State Senate
- Craig M. Johnson (born 1971), New York State Senator
- Craig B. Johnson, mayor of Elk Grove Village, Illinois

== Sports ==
- Craig Johnson (American football) (born 1960), American football coach
- Craig Johnson (ice hockey, born 1972), American ice hockey player
- Craig Johnson (tennis), American tennis player

== See also ==
- Craig Johnston (born 1960), former Australian football (soccer) player
- Craig Johnston (politician) (born 1951), Australian LGBT activist and politician
