= Kristine Crabb =

New Zealand fashion designer and artist

- Born: 10 October 1978 (age 48); Matamata, New Zealand
- Education: Whanganui Polytechnic
- Occupation: Fashion designer
- Labels: Ripshit and Bust; Miss Crabb; Gloria
- Children: Frances, Paddy, Henry

Kristine Mary Crabb (born 10 October 1978) is a New Zealand fashion designer and artist. She is known for her Karangahape Road boutique Rip Shit and Bust which ran from 2001 to 2003, and for her fashion label Miss Crabb which ran from 2004 to 2019. In 2020 she launched Gloria, described by Crabb as a wide-ranging creative project.

Crabb's designs have been worn by notable New Zealand women including New Zealand Prime Minister Jacinda Ardern, Lorde, Bic Runga and Anika Moa, as well as by other local and international artists, political leaders and musicians and broadcasters.

Crabb's career and work is characterised by its close connection to art, and throughout her career she has undertaken numerous collaborations with notable visual artists, filmmakers and musicians including Richard Orjis, Florian Habicht, and Ruth Buchanan.

Pieces from the design archives of Miss Crabb sit in the permanent collection of the Auckland War Memorial Museum Tāmaki Paenga Hira.

== Personal life ==
Crabb lives and works in inner-city Auckland, New Zealand. She has three children with the artist Andrew Barber.

=== Early life ===
Crabb was born in the rural Waikato town of Matamata on 10 October 1978. She was born to Noeline and Jefferson Crabb, with two older siblings.

Crabb was raised on a farm next door to her paternal grandmother Gloria Crabb (née Stansel). Crabb has often noted that her grandmother was a great inspiration for her life and work. An aviator, Gloria Crabb was the second woman to fly the Tasman after Jean Batton. She was also a motorcyclist and a Labour voter.

Crabb attended high school in Hamilton and started making clothes as a teenager "as a way of communicating and showing that you're free." In 1996 she commenced study at Whanganui Polytechnic and graduated in 2000.

== Career ==
Crabb's designs are described as being defined by their spirit of rebellion, experimentation and subversion, and romanticism. She has stated that she wanted to make conceptual clothes that possessed a "sense of empowerment and freedom for women – and men as well."

=== Rip Shit and Bust ===
Crabb established Rip Shit and Bust with Jonelle Hanrahan on Auckland's Karangahape Road in 2001. The experimental store-cum-studio sold one-off pieces by her friends from fashion school and art school including Maiangi Waitai of Dead Martin, Janet Tristram, Mack Duggan and Caroline Anderson, as well as Crabb's first label Non. Non was also stocked in boutiques in New Zealand and Australia.

At the time Karangahape Road was a centre for counter-culture in New Zealand and was notorious as Auckland's red-light district. Rip Shit and Bust was also characterised by cultural subversion, and through making and selling one-off pieces Crabb was able to experiment.

In 2003 the Auckland Art Gallery Toi o Tāmaki invited Rip Shit and Bust to present a show.

=== Miss Crabb ===
In 2004 Crabb established her eponymous label Miss Crabb, which ran until 2019.

An internationally renowned fashion label and a cult brand in New Zealand, Miss Crabb began as an art and business project, conceived as an alternative way of making and wearing clothes and as a response to what Crabb viewed as restricting conventions of the fashion industry. Crabb designed every collection and was the creative director of most aspects of the label.

Miss Crabb was concerned with ecological sustainability, and all collections were produced in New Zealand. For 15 years the Miss Crabb retail store was located at 41 Ponsonby Road. Originally, the Miss Crabb studio was above the retail store, and was later moved to a location nearby in Ponsonby.

The defining Miss Crabb design and silhouette emerged partly from Crabb's development of sustainable production processes; Crabb's patterns were created from geometric shapes that utilised an entire piece of fabric, ensuring that there was no surplus waste. Often cut in silk, this method resulted in clothes that could be tied, draped and wrapped in numerous ways, creating a distinct volume and garments with fluid, changeable silhouettes.

The fluidity of Miss Crabb garments also reflected Crabb's unconventional commitment to designing clothes for a broad range of body sizes and shapes. Many Miss Crabb dresses were one-size and suitable for diverse bodies; sizing ranged upwards of size 18, and included clothes suitable for full-term pregnancy, nursing, and postnatal bodies.

As well as being sold in the Miss Crabb boutique, the label was stocked extensively in stores in New Zealand, Australia, and Los Angeles. Miss Crabb has been worn by prominent New Zealand figures including Jacinda Ardern and Lorde, as well as Parris Goebel, Connan Mockasin, and Amelie Pichard.

In 2018 Crabb announced the closure of Miss Crabb, news which was met by surprise from the local industry and media, and was extensively covered by the New Zealand press. In an interview for The New Zealand Herald she explained that she felt the Miss Crabb project had been a collaboration of "creative minds and kindred spirits" which was now finished, and that she was looking forward to spending more time with her children.

Following the closure, pieces from the label's archives were acquired by the Auckland War Memorial Museum Tāmaki Paenga Hira. In 2019 pieces from the Miss Crabb archive and art collection were sold by fine art auction house Webb's in "The Estate of Miss Crabb."

==== Collaborations ====
Miss Crabb was defined by its connections with broader cultural scenes, and the label was involved in numerous collaborations with visual artists, filmmakers, and musicians. Of note is Crabb's ongoing collaborative relationship with artist Richard Orjis, who has photographed numerous Miss Crabb campaigns.

From 2005 the window of the Miss Crabb boutique housed the art gallery dep_art_ment. The gallery was founded and run by Orjis, and later run by the artist Erica Van Zon. During its course the window gallery showed works by emerging artists including Fiona Connor, Simon Denny, Kate Newby, Andrew Barber, Seung Yul Oh, and Tessa Laird.

In 2005 the artist Fiona Connor created a replica of the front door of the Miss Crabb store, titled Miss Crabb Door, which now belongs in the permanent collection of the Dunedin Public Art Gallery.

In 2017 the filmmakers Florian Habicht and Teresa Peters directed and starred in a film for the "Romantica" collection. Later collaborations included projects with artist Areez Katki, with photographers Andrei Blidarean and Oliver Guyon, and with artist Anna Sisson and DJ Creamy Mami.

=== Gloria ===
In 2019 Crabb announced her next project Gloria, described by Crabb as "a dedication to my divine grandmother, her strength and love of life, curiosity and beauty."

Gloria is conceived by Crabb as a wide ranging creative project, and will include a perfume collaboration with New Zealand perfumer Tiffany Witehira of Curionoir.
