= Iaia (disambiguation) =

Iaia was a Greek painter. Iaia may also refer to:

== People ==
- Iaia Fiastri (1934–2018), Italian screenwriter
- Iaia Forte (born 1962), Italian actress
- Mamadú Iaia Djaló (c. 1962–2021), Guinea-Bissau politician

== Other uses ==
- Institute of American Indian Arts, art college
- International Association for Impact Assessment, professional association for impact assessment
