= Welby Ings =

New Zealand director and academic (born 1956)

- Ings in 2025
- Born: Welby John Ings; 1956 (age 69–70)

Academic background
- Education: University of Waikato; Auckland University of Technology
- Thesis: Talking pictures: a creative utilization of structural and aesthetic profiles from narrative music videos and television commercials in a non-spoken film text (2005)
- Doctoral advisors: Colin Gibbs; Barry King

Academic work
- Institutions: Auckland University of Technology
- Doctoral students: Richard Orjis; Maree Sheehan

Welby John Ings (born 1956) is a New Zealand film director, author, academic and political activist. He is a professor of design at Auckland University of Technology. Ings was awarded the Prime Minister's Supreme Award for Tertiary Teaching Excellence in 2002, and has won multiple awards for his films, which include Boy, Munted, Sparrow and Punch.

== Early life and education ==
Born in 1956, Ings was raised in the rural community of Pukeatua, in the Waikato region of New Zealand. He did not learn to read or write until he was fifteen years old. During his early schooling, he was described as a slow learner and was later expelled from school. He subsequently studied at the University of Waikato and Auckland University of Technology (AUT). In 2006, he received a Doctor of Philosophy degree from AUT.

== Education and academic work ==
Ings has worked as a teacher and academic in New Zealand. He has taught at primary, secondary and tertiary levels in Hamilton, Taihape, Northland and Auckland, and lectures at AUT, where he holds the academic position of Professor of Design. He supervises postgraduate research in subjects including visual arts, design, public policy, and education. His published academic work includes research on language, education, creative practice and research methodology.

Ings' pedagogical research focuses on practice-led, artistic scholarship, heuristic inquiry and the nurturing of independent thought. He is the author of Invisible Intelligence and Disobedient Teaching, and an advocate for approaches to education that support diverse forms of intelligence. He is also an outspoken critic of dehumanised learning systems, micromanaged assessment and templated thinking.

In 2002, Ings received the inaugural Prime Minister's Supreme Award for Tertiary Teaching Excellence. In 2013, Auckland University of Technology awarded him the inaugural AUT University Medal for his contributions to research and education. He is a Fellow of the UK Royal Society of Arts, and is the elected academic staff representative on the AUT University Council Governing Body.

== Queer language and activism ==
Quilt panel made by Ings, for Ian Williams

Quilt panel made by Ings, for Kevin Todd

During the 1970s and 1980s, Ings was involved in campaigns for homosexual law reform in New Zealand. He was arrested during this period, and later spoke publicly about the experiences of queer people living in rural communities.

During the AIDS epidemic, he created memorial quilt panels for Kevin Todd and Ian Williams, two of his partners who died from AIDS-related illness. The panels form part of the New Zealand AIDS Memorial Quilt collection, which documents the impact of the epidemic in New Zealand.

In his academic work, Ings writes extensively about queer language, specifically the underground slang that, with the rise of Gay liberation in the early 1970s, largely disappeared from use.

In 2022, Ings was involved in the development of Ia~, AUT's online portal for research relating to rainbow communities.

== Filmmaking ==
Ings has made several films. His work often deals with marginalised people. In 2005, his Oscar-qualifying short film boy, typographically voiced the story of a mute, male prostitute. His 2011 film, Munted, examined the consequences of a false accusation of paedophilia. In 2017, he wrote and directed Sparrow, a short film set partly against the background of World War II. The film explores family relationships, bullying and homosexuality. Sparrow won more than 20 international awards, and was officially selected for over 80 film festivals. Ings made his feature film directorial debut with Punch, released in 2022. He wrote and directed the film, which stars Tim Roth, Jordan Oosterhof and Conan Hayes. The film follows a teenage boxer who develops a relationship with Whetu, a young takatāpui musician, while dealing with his relationship with his alcoholic father and the attitudes of his community. Punch premiered at the New Zealand International Film Festival in July 2022.

== Selected publications ==
- Ings, W. (2017). Disobedient teaching: Surviving and creating change in education. Otago University Press. ISBN 978-1-927322-66-6
- Ings, W. (2025). Invisible intelligence: Why your child might not be failing. Otago University Press. ISBN 978-1-991348-01-2
- Ings, W., & Tudor, K. (Eds.). (2025). Heuristic enquiries: Research across disciplines and professions. Routledge. ISBN 978-1-032-83095-7

== Selected films ==
- Boy (2004) Room8 productions
- Munted (2011) M.F. Films
- Sparrow (2016) Robyn Murphy productions
- Punch (2022) Robin Murphy Productions & Blueskin Films
