= Maree Sheehan =

Audio designer and artist in New Zealand

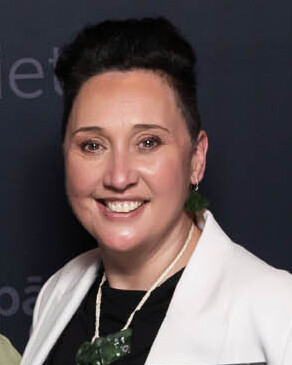
- Born: 1969
- Awards: Royal Society Te Apārangi Te Kōpūnui Māori Research Award

Academic background
- Education: Auckland University of Technology
- Theses: Kawea mai te wā o mua, hei konei, hei āpōpō Bring the past to the present for the future (2014); The Sound of Identity Interpreting the Multi-dimensionality of Wāhine Māori Through Audio Portraiture (2020)
- Doctoral advisor: Welby Ings, Hinematau McNeill
- Other advisors: Hinematau McNeill, Elisa Duder

Maree Alicia Hiria Sheehan (born 1969) is a New Zealand sonic artist, sound designer, composer and lecturer, and is a research fellow in the Te Manawahoukura Research Centre at Te Wānanga o Aotearoa. In 2024 the Royal Society Te Apārangi awarded Sheehan the Te Koponui Māori Research Award for her creation of audio portraits of Māori women.

== Early life and education ==
Sheehan was born in Leeston and grew up in Canterbury, Pōrangahau in the Hawke's Bay, and Christchurch. She has affiliations to Ngāti Maniapoto-Waikato, Ngāti Tūwharetoa, Ngāti Raukawa and Ngāti Tahu-Ngāti Whaoa, and Irish ancestry through her father. Sheehan attended the Polynesian Performing Arts Centre in Christchurch.

== Career ==
Sheehan released several singles in the 1990s as a singer-songwriter, including three which reached the top twenty. Her music featured in the film Once Were Warriors, and in the television series Shortland Street; Home, Land and Sea; and Takatapui. In 1993 Sheehan was nominated for most promising vocalist at the New Zealand Music Awards, and in 1996 her album Past to Present was nominated for Best Mana Māori Album. She released an album Chasing the Light in 2013.

Sheehan completed a master's degree and a PhD at Auckland University of Technology. Her doctoral research was titled The Sound of Identity Interpreting the Multi-dimensionality of Wāhine Māori Through Audio Portraiture. Sheehan has worked at Ngā Pae o te Māramatanga research centre, and was head of the postgraduate programme at Auckland University of Technology's School of Art and Design. Sheehan is a research fellow at Te Manawahoukura Research Centre at Te Wānanga o Aotearoa.

Sheehan's solo exhibition Ōtairongo at Artspace Aotearoa in 2020 presented audio portraits of three Māori women, Moana Maniapoto, Te Rita Papesch and Ramon Te Wake.

== Honours and awards ==
In 2021, Sheehan was awarded the Professional Development Award for Screen Composition from the Australian Performing Rights Association and in 2022 the APRA Art Music Fund award for composition.

She received the MAITAI Whangai Award for mentoring band Nesian Mystik.

In 2024 the Royal Society Te Apārangi awarded Sheehan the Te Koponui Maori Research Award "for her innovative scholarship, focused on audio portraiture and sonic practices that has elevated the voices and identities of wāhine Māori".
