= Eve van Grafhorst =

Australian child infected with HIV

- Born: 17 July 1982; St Leonards, New South Wales, Australia
- Died: 20 November 1993 (aged 11); Hastings, New Zealand
- Occupation: Student
- Known for: HIV-related controversy in Australia

Eve van Grafhorst (17 July 1982 – 20 November 1993) was one of the first Australian children to be infected with HIV via a blood transfusion. She became the centre of a controversy in 1985 when she was banned from her local pre-school amid fears she might infect other children.

== Early life ==
Van Grafhorst was born prematurely in 1982, and required eleven blood transfusions to save her life. One of the transfusions was contaminated, and she contracted HIV.

== Controversy in Australia ==
In February 1985, her parents enrolled her in a pre-school in Kincumber, New South Wales. When she bit another child, the state medical officer for New South Wales said van Grafhorst should be barred from daycare until she was older. After her condition became known, parents of other preschoolers threatened to withdraw their children if she was re-enrolled, saying that the young girl posed a grave threat of infection. She was eventually permitted to attend school, provided she wore a plastic face mask at all times. Some parents felt that was insufficient, and that the van Grafhorsts should leave town.

== Relocation to New Zealand ==
The van Grafhorsts did leave, moving to Hastings, New Zealand, in 1986. In contrast to their Australian experience, the van Grafhorst family was welcomed in Hastings. Van Grafhorst lived a relatively normal life, and attended a local school without incident.

== Later life and recognition ==
In 1992, she received a Variety Gold Heart Award. Her story had been widely reported throughout the world and, on her tenth birthday, van Grafhorst, dressed as a radiant bride, was sent a letter and autographed photograph of Diana, Princess of Wales. After van Grafhorst died at home in 1993, aged 11, her mother, Gloria, received a sympathetic letter from Diana, praising van Grafhorst for her "courage and strength".

== Legacy ==
The 1994 TV documentary All About Eve (in reference to the 1950 film), produced by Vincent Burke and directed by Monique Oomen, is a biography of van Grafhorst.

== See also ==
- HIV/AIDS in New Zealand
- HIV/AIDS in Australia
