= Kyle Wealleans =

New Zealand cricketer (born 1969)

Personal information
- Full name: Kyle Andrew Wealleans
- Born: 2 March 1969 (age 57); Matamata, Waikato, New Zealand
- Batting: Right-handed
- Role: Batsman

Domestic team information
- Years: Team
- 1988/89–1994/95: Northern Districts

Career statistics
Competition	FC	LA
Matches	43	22
Runs scored	2,053	591
Batting average	29.32	31.10
100s/50s	4/11	0/3
Top score	112*	77*
Catches/stumpings	23/–	7/–
- Source: Cricinfo, 31 December 2024

Kyle Andrew Wealleans (born 2 May 1969) is a former New Zealand cricketer who played 43 first-class matches for Northern Districts between 1989 and 1995. He was born in Matamata.

Wealleans was a batsman who often opened the innings. His highest first-class score was 112 not out for Northern Districts against Wellington in 1989–90. Later that season, when Northern Districts played the touring Indian Test team, he scored 101 and 61.
