= Craig Johnston (politician) =

Politician

Craig Fredric Johnston (born 1951) is an LGBT activist and former politician. He was active in the Australian Labor Party, Communist Party of Australia. He is considered a founding member of the gay rights movement in Sydney in the 1970s and 1980s, having established the Gay Rights Lobby with Lex Watson in 1980, four years before homosexuality was decriminalised in New South Wales in 1984.

== Education ==
An activist and office-holder with the Australian Union of Students, he dropped out of a University of New South Wales Commerce degree and then completed a Political Science degree with Honours at the University of Sydney.

== Activism ==
He had become a "leading gay activist" by the late 1970s and 1980s, and was involved in the beginnings of the Sydney Gay and Lesbian Mardi Gras as well as co-organising the first AIDS candlelight vigils in Australia. In 1980 he co-founded the Gay Rights Lobby with Lex Watson.

Johnston is considered one of Australia's "most important gay activists" both for his practical activities and "his contribution to the theory and practice of gay politics."

== Sydney City Council ==
He was elected as Sydney City Council alderman in 1984. Along with independents Brian McGahen and Bill Hunt, aldermen elected in the same year, he was one of the first gay city officials in Sydney. Initially elected for the Australian Labor Party (ALP), as a member of the party's left wing, he was expelled in 1985 for refusing to vote with the Liberal Party members of Council as directed by the state ALP branch. He continued to sit as an independent and served until 1987.

== Publishing ==
Johnston is the author of several works on the gay rights movement, with a particular focus on Sydney, including:

- Homosexuality: myths and realities (1982)
- A Sydney gaze : the making of gay liberation (1999)
- Queer city: gay and lesbian politics in Sydney (2001; co-authored with Paul van Reyk)

Political and academic writing, generally focused on local and Australian social issues, has included texts for the Australian Left Review Alternative Law Journal, Impact Assessment and Project Appraisal, and Labour History (journal), while for the gay press he contributed to the Sydney Star Observer.
