= Australian AIDS Memorial Quilt =

Memorial quilt project honoring lives lost to AIDS-related causes

The Australian AIDS Memorial Quilt is an Australian memorial to celebrate the lives of people who have died of AIDS-related causes. It was founded in September 1988 by Andrew Carter and Richard Johnson in Sydney and was formally launched of World AIDS Day (1 December) 1988 by Ita Buttrose. Buttrose was the then chairperson of the National Advisory Committee on AIDS.

It was inspired by the NAMES Project AIDS Memorial Quilt which was started in the United States in 1985 and, when the Australian quilt was first shown it was made up of 35 panels and it was displayed alongside panels of the NAMES quilt which had been sent for the display.

The quilt now consists of 700 panels, each of which are 'grave sized' (6 x 3 feet), and it is the largest AIDS memorial quilt excluding the NAMES quilt. When the quilt is laid out in full it would measure hundreds of square metres and it is a visual demonstration of the magnitude of the AIDS-crisis in Australia.

== Background ==
Carter was inspired to create the Australian AIDS Memorial Quilt and seeing the NAMES quilt on a tour of the United States and, later, in 1991 was awarded an Medal of the Order of Australia for it and "[i]n recognition of service to promoting community awareness of HIV/AIDS".

Between its launch in 1988 and the early 1990s panels were added at a rate of approximately seven a week, as people died and, despite this, many saw it as generating hope for a time when no new panels would need to be added. When new panels were produced public ceremonies, handing them over to the quilt project, would be held and these often took place in conjunction with candlelight vigils.

Each panel of the quilt is made by the friends, family members, partners and carers of those memorialised and often include mementoes from them including clothing, favourite objects and photographs. One of the reasons for doing so was a humanise the people that had died for those who had no personal connection to them and knew little of the crisis besides sensationalist media.

Some panels are anonymous but, despite this, since its creation much work has been done to document the lives of those listed by name. Of the quilt a caretaker for it said that:

[The quilt is important] "so there is a record of that person existing, whereas with a lot of people with AIDS, that (record) is not there. There's a whole generation of people - unless we tell their stories, they are not there."

— Libby Woodhams, Sydney Quilt Project Convenor, 2010, via Powerhouse Collections

The majority of the quilt is now held by the Powerhouse Museum, who acquired it in 2000, and it is housed in purpose built storage there. Additionally significant efforts have been to maintain, store and document the quilt which has included consulting with the family members of many of the individuals listed. There has, however, been controversy with some communities requesting the return of panels to local museums, close to family and friends, and being denied. Part of the reason for this disagreement is the lack of queer inclusion in Australian museums and some queer communities not seeing the existing public institutions as relevant to advancing their cultural or political goals.

Parts of the quilt have been displayed in numerous exhibitions including 64 panels being sent to Washington, D.C. in 1992 to be part of the International Quilt Display. There was also the loan of a panel to St Vincent's Hospital in 2014 to commemorate 30 years since they opened the first dedicated HIV/AIDS ward in Australia.

One of the entrants on the quilt is gay activist and City of Sydney Alderman Brian McGahen. His panel was made by members of Sydney Communists in 1991.

== Other Australian AIDS memorial quilts ==
Other AIDS memorial quilts in Australia include:

- The Brisbane AIDS Memorial Quilt
- The Melbourne AIDS Memorial Quilt
- South Australia’s AIDS Memorial Quilt
- Western Australia’s AIDS Memorial Quilt

== See also ==
- NAMES Project AIDS Memorial Quilt
- New Zealand AIDS Memorial Quilt
