= Brian McGahen =

Australian politician

Brian Patrick McGahen (3 March 1952 – 2 April 1990) was an Australian gay activist and social libertarian who was also a social worker and drug councillor who lived openly throughout his life as a gay man. He also served as a councillor/alderman for the City of Sydney Council in which he represented to Flinders Ward from 1984 to 1987.

== Biography ==
McGahen was born at Camperdown in Sydney to hairdresser Patrick James McGahen and Monica Marie (née Pettit) Anderson and grew up in Enfield. After attending De La Salle College Ashfield, he received a Bachelor of Social Studies from the University of Sydney in 1974. As a high school and university student he opposed the Vietnam War and, at 17, refused to register for conscription and due to this, and his advocacy of draft resistance, he was convicted of sedition and spent some months in jail before the election of the Whitlam Government. When at university he became a member of the Communist Party of Australia.

From 1974 to 1975 he worked as a social worker and drug counsellor, and he became a founding member of the Australian Social Welfare Union in 1976. Working first on the methadone program with the Health Commission of New South Wales, he also worked for the State Department of Youth and Community Services and in the 1980s reviewed the New South Wales Family Support Services Scheme.

In the mid-1970s, McGahen became involved in the campaign for gay rights as a member of Sydney Gay Liberation and the Socialist Lesbians & Male Homosexuals. He was an organiser for the National Homosexual Conference in 1978 and served as chairman of the Sydney Mardi Gras Association from 1981 to 1984. In this role he was instrumental in making it financially viable with the creation of after-parade parties, however, he could be a controversial figure. Some accused him of trying to make the event communist one while others believed he was a spy for the Australian Labor Party; despite this a friend of his said that he wanted to professionalise the Mardi Gras while ensuring that it did not lose its radical roots.

He stood as the Communist candidate for Lord Mayor of Sydney in 1980 without success. In 1984, together with fellow Communist Jack Mundey, he was elected as an independent to Sydney City Council for the Flinders ward, serving until the council's dismissal on 26 March 1987. During this period he served as a member on various council committees (including the health and cultural committees) and, during his tenure, numerous policies were implemented to prevent discrimination against LGBTQ peoples within council services. Along with Craig Johnston and Bill Hunt, elected at the same time, he was the first openly gay member of the council.

McGahen became director of a home care service in 1986, and he supported extended care to AIDS sufferers, spousal immigration rights, and a permanent LGBTQ community centre. He joined the Pride steering committee in 1989 and became treasurer.

In 1987 he had been diagnosed with HIV and, in 1990, chose voluntary euthanasia and, in doing so, was the first person with HIV/AIDS to do so publicly. He died at Elizabeth Bay on 2 April 1990, and was cremated. Before his death, organised his own memorial service to be held at Sydney Town Hall where over 300 people joined to celebrate his life.

Following his death Clover Moore, then a fellow councillor, stated:

We have lost another inner city community activist and leader of the gay and lesbian community. Brian was a fervent believer in people working together for the common good. He gave people faith in their power to make changes. he will be greatly missed

— Clover Moore, Sydney Star Observer, 4 May 1990

== Legacy ==
- In 1991 he was included of the Australian AIDS Memorial Quilt, which is now held at the Powerhouse Museum, and his panel was made by members of the Sydney Communists.
- In 1992 he was posthumously inducted into the Sydney Gay and Lesbian Mardi Gras Association Hall of Fame.

== Collections ==
McGahen's papers are held by the State Library of New South Wales: Brian McGahen papers, ca. 1950-1990.
