= Matamata =

Town in Waikato, New Zealand

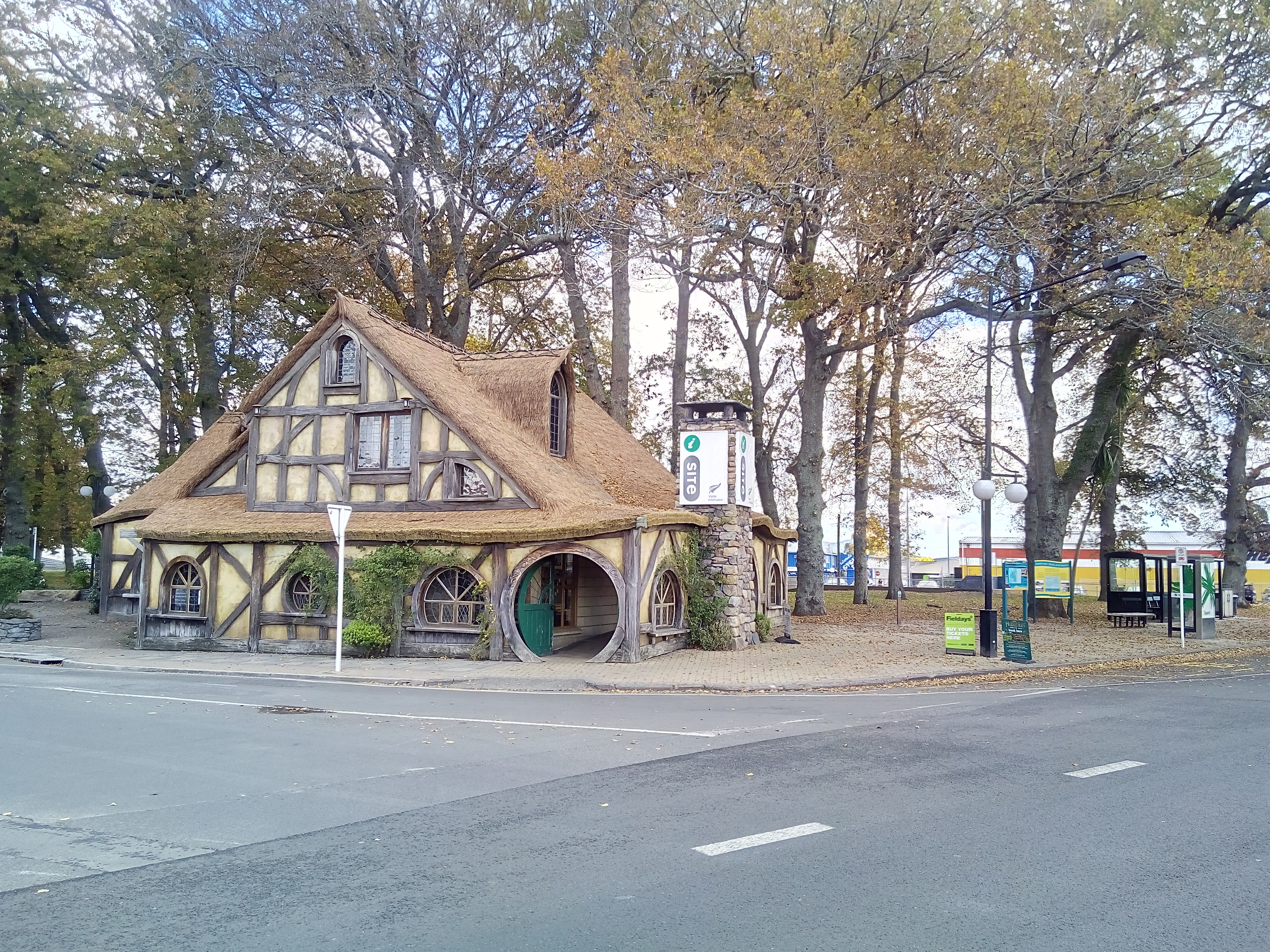
- Matamata information centre
- Interactive map of Matamata
- Location within New Zealand
- Coordinates: 37°49′S 175°46′E
- Country: New Zealand
- Region: Waikato
- Territorial authority: Matamata-Piako District
- Ward: Matamata General Ward
- Electorates: Waikato; Hauraki-Waikato (Māori)

Government
  - Territorial Authority: Matamata-Piako District Council
  - Regional council: Waikato Regional Council
  - Mayor of Matamata-Piako: Ash Tanner
  - Waikato MP: Tim van de Molen
  - Hauraki-Waikato MP: Hana-Rawhiti Maipi-Clarke

Area
  - Total: 9.59 km^{2} (3.70 sq mi)
- Elevation: 63 m (207 ft)

Population (June 2025)
  - Total: 9,540
  - Density: 995/km^{2} (2,580/sq mi)
- Time zone: UTC+12 (NZST)
  - Summer (DST): UTC+13 (NZDT)
- Postcode: 3400
- Area code: 07

Matamata (Māori: [ˈmataˌmata]) is a town in Waikato, New Zealand. It is located near the base of the Kaimai Ranges, and is a thriving farming area known for Thoroughbred horse breeding and training pursuits. It is part of the Matamata-Piako District, which takes in the surrounding rural areas, as well as Morrinsville and Te Aroha. State Highway 27 and the Kinleith Branch railway run through the town. The town has a population of 9,540 as of June 2025.

A nearby farm was the location for the Hobbiton Movie Set in Peter Jackson's The Lord of the Rings. During the period between the filming of The Lord of the Rings: The Return of the King and The Hobbit: An Unexpected Journey they had no furniture or props, but could be entered with vistas of the farm viewed from inside them. A "Welcome to Hobbiton" sign has been placed on the main road. In 2011, parts of Hobbiton began to close in preparation for the three new movies based on the first Tolkien novel, The Hobbit.

== Demographics ==
In 1876 Matamata had 7 homesteads housing 40 European settlers. In 1901 the Matamata Road Board had 300 residents, 50 dwellings, 60 rate payers and 80 rateable properties.

Matamata covers 9.59 km^{2} (3.70 sq mi) and had an estimated population of 9,540 as of June 2025, with a population density of 995 people per km^{2}.

Historical population
Year	Pop.	±% p.a.
2006	6,297	—
2013	7,260	+2.05%
2018	8,043	+2.07%
2023	9,132	+2.57%
The 2006 population is for a smaller area of 6.16 km^{2}. Source:

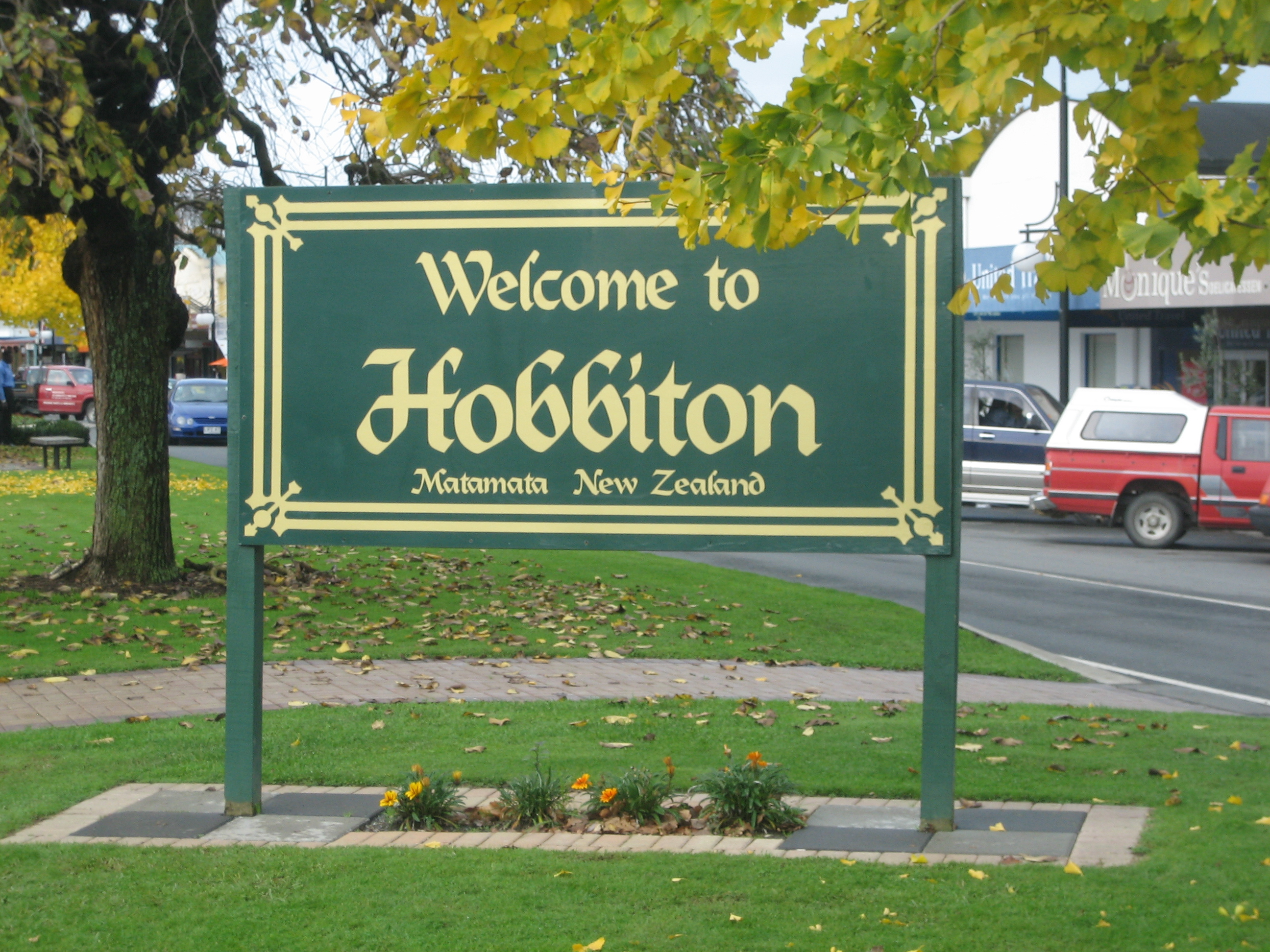
Sign in Matamata identifying town as the location where the Hobbiton scenes from the Lord of the Rings were filmed

Matamata had a population of 9,132 in the 2023 New Zealand census, an increase of 1,089 people (13.5%) since the 2018 census, and an increase of 1,872 people (25.8%) since the 2013 census. There were 4,386 males, 4,716 females and 27 people of other genders in 3,696 dwellings. 2.1% of people identified as LGBTIQ+. The median age was 47.0 years (compared with 38.1 years nationally). There were 1,536 people (16.8%) aged under 15 years, 1,428 (15.6%) aged 15 to 29, 3,429 (37.5%) aged 30 to 64, and 2,742 (30.0%) aged 65 or older.

People could identify as more than one ethnicity. The results were 84.5% European (Pākehā); 17.0% Māori; 2.1% Pasifika; 6.4% Asian; 0.7% Middle Eastern, Latin American and African New Zealanders (MELAA); and 2.1% other, which includes people giving their ethnicity as "New Zealander". English was spoken by 97.2%, Māori language by 3.0%, Samoan by 0.2%, and other languages by 7.4%. No language could be spoken by 1.7% (e.g. too young to talk). New Zealand Sign Language was known by 0.6%. The percentage of people born overseas was 18.0, compared with 28.8% nationally.

Religious affiliations were 32.7% Christian, 1.2% Hindu, 0.3% Islam, 1.3% Māori religious beliefs, 0.8% Buddhist, 0.3% New Age, and 1.4% other religions. People who answered that they had no religion were 53.4%, and 8.7% of people did not answer the census question.

Of those at least 15 years old, 960 (12.6%) people had a bachelor's or higher degree, 4,248 (55.9%) had a post-high school certificate or diploma, and 2,388 (31.4%) people exclusively held high school qualifications. The median income was $35,600, compared with $41,500 nationally. 555 people (7.3%) earned over $100,000 compared to 12.1% nationally. The employment status of those at least 15 was that 3,384 (44.5%) people were employed full-time, 951 (12.5%) were part-time, and 141 (1.9%) were unemployed.

Individual statistical areas
Name	Area (km^{2})	Population	Density (per km^{2})	Dwellings	Median age	Median income
Matamata North	3.03	3,300	1,089	1,374	46.7 years	$35,800
Matamata West	4.09	3,480	851	1,332	43.4 years	$36,100
Matamata East	2.47	2,355	955	993	53.6 years	$34,300
New Zealand					38.1 years	$41,500

== Etymology ==
The name Matamata was originally applied to a settlement near the Anglican mission at Waharoa. The name Matamata was used for Josiah Firth's estate and as a town developed near the estate it took the name.

== History ==
The first European thought to have visited the Matamata area was the trader Phillip Tapsell in about 1830. In 1833 the Reverend Alfred Nesbit Brown visited the area and in 1835 opened a mission near Matamata Pa, but this closed the following year when intertribal warfare broke out. In 1865 Josiah Firth negotiated with Ngāti Hauā leader Wiremu Tamihana and leased a large area of land, including the future site of the town which he named after the pā. Firth constructed a dray road to Cambridge and cleared the Waihou River so that it was navigable by his (small) boats.

Firth's estate later failed and by 1904 had been wholly obtained by the Crown and was subdivided into dairy farm units to take advantage of the new technology of refrigeration. It became a dependent Town District in 1917, an independent Town District in 1919 and was constituted a borough in 1935. With the re-organisation of territorial authorities in New Zealand in 1989, Matamata became part of the Matamata-Piako District.

=== Railway station ===
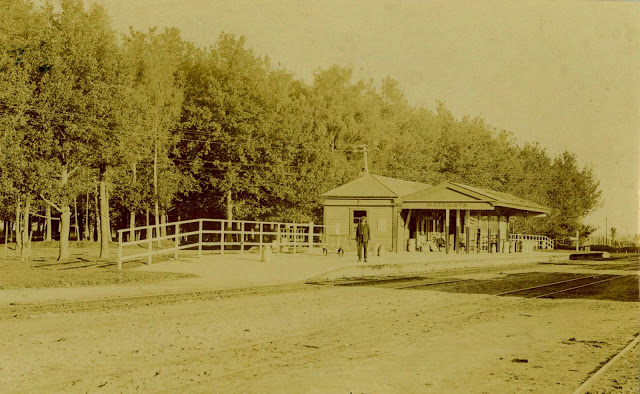
Plantations of oak, larch, chestnut and ash were established near many railway stations. Matamata’s is registered in Council’s District Plan for Hetana St.

Matamata was a station on the Kinleith Branch, from Monday 8 March 1886. It was built by Mr D Fallon for the Thames Valley & Rotorua Railway Co. New Zealand Railways Department took over the line on 1 April 1886. Initially 40 minutes north of the temporary terminus at Oxford (Tirau) and about an hour from Morrinsville. For a while Matamata seems to have become a flag station, though it did have cattle yards and a 60 ft (18 m) by 30 ft (9.1 m) a goods shed. By 1886 it also had a coal shed able to hold 50 tons, a stationmaster's house, 2 cottages, urinals and a 20,000 imp gal (91,000 L) brick water tank supplied by a 60 ft (18 m) diameter windpump from a well, which was deepened that year. By 1896 Matamata had gained a 4th class station, platform, cart approach and a passing loop for 32 wagons. A telephone came in 1912 and a verandah in 1914. Authority to shift the verandah at Avondale station to Matamata when new station is built, and re-erect, amount £35. House for stationmaster. Platform extended to 175 feet. To extend it to 300 feet will cost £90. Authority for £60 for platform extension. 1919 extension of the verandah have been authorised. In 1919 part of the old Drury station building was erected as a luggage room at Matamata. Improvements are to be put in hand, estimated cost £6,000. Lighting of station and houses. 1927 Additional seating accommodation on platform. 1953 Approval for bicycle shed, estimated cost £90. There was a Post Office at the station until 1911. It had two members of staff from 1913. Matamata was included in the annual returns of railway traffic. For example, in 1924 it sold 26,367 tickets and exported 26,084 sheep and pigs. In 1950 8,868 tickets were sold and it transported 42,322 sheep and pigs. A petrol engined shunter was used in the station yard from 1936. Several Drewry 0-4-0 shunters were introduced in 1936.

The station building was replaced on Monday 17 May 1965 by a new £23,500 steel portal frame and block-work building, with a new platform and approach road from Hetana Street, built by Way & Works Branch staff. The old station was sold for removal by July 1967.

Matamata closed to passengers on 12 November 1968, but reopened to serve the Geyserland Express from 9 December 1991 until 7 October 2001.

Since closure the station has been the Railside by the Green community centre since 2002, though it is fenced off from the platform. Occasional excursions still use the platform.

	Former adjoining stations	
Waharoa; Line open, station closed 3.75 km (2.33 mi)	Kinleith Branch	Hinuera; Line open, station closed 7.91 km (4.92 mi)

== Sports ==
Matamata is home to the Matamata Swifts soccer team, who compete in the Lotto Sport Italia NRFL Division 1A.

== Educational institutions ==
Matamata College is the town's co-educational state secondary school, with a roll of 830 as of July 2026. It opened as Matamata District High School in 1918 with a new building and official opening in 1924.

Matamata Intermediate is the town's co-educational state intermediate school, with a roll of 399. Originally part of Matamata College, it became a separate school in 1961.

There are two co-educational state primary schools: Matamata Primary School, with a roll of 505; and Firth School, with a roll of 228. Matamata Primary started as Matamata Public School in February 1900. It could accommodate up to 26 pupils and was enlarged after being destroyed by a fire in 1905 or 1906.

Matamata Christian School is a co-educational state integrated Christian primary school, with a roll of 140. It was founded in 1988 as Rainbow Park Christian School, and became state integrated in 1998.

St Joseph's Catholic School is a co-educational state integrated Catholic school, with a roll of 24. It opened in 1930.

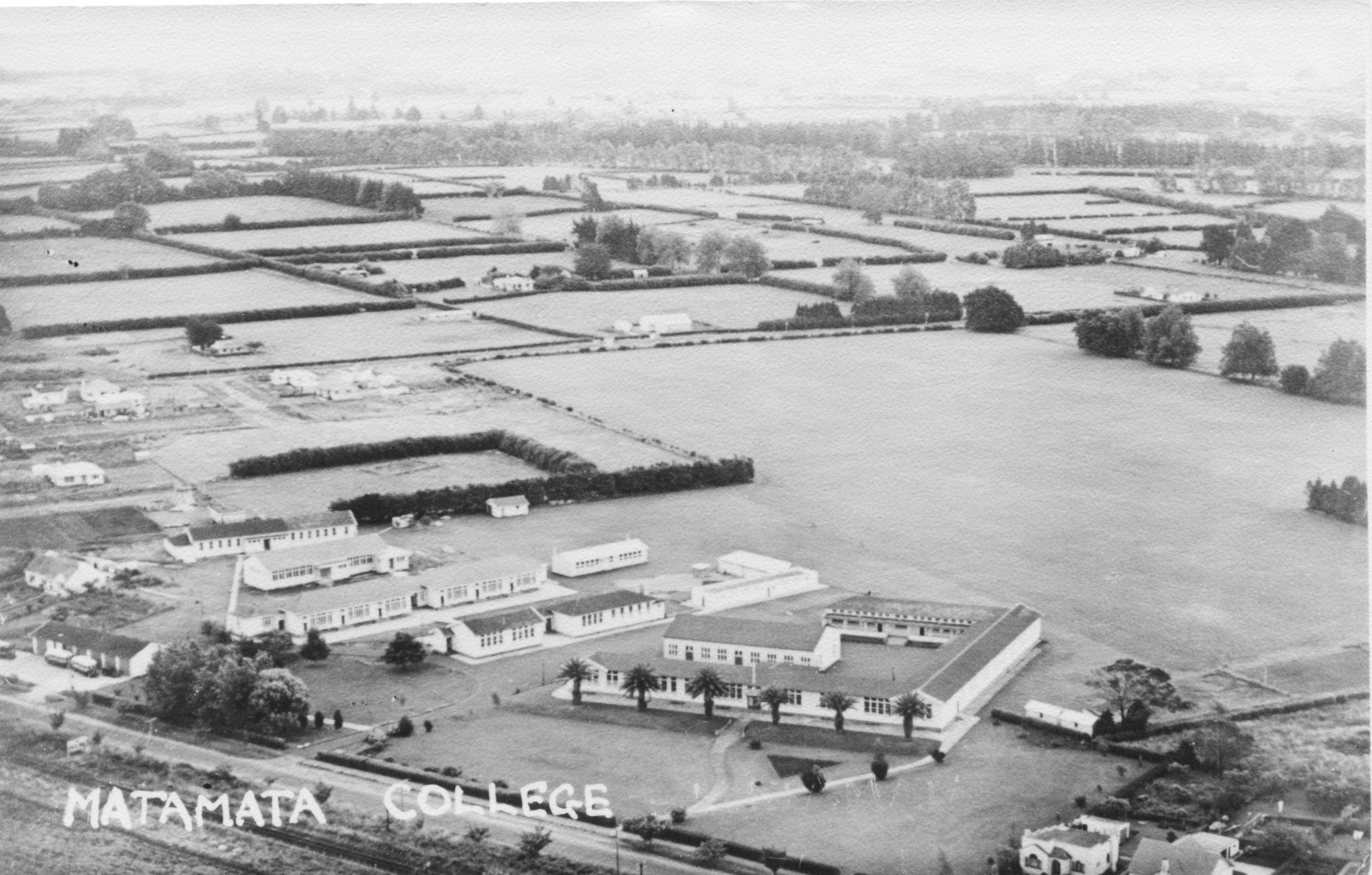
Aerial view of Matamata College in the 1940s

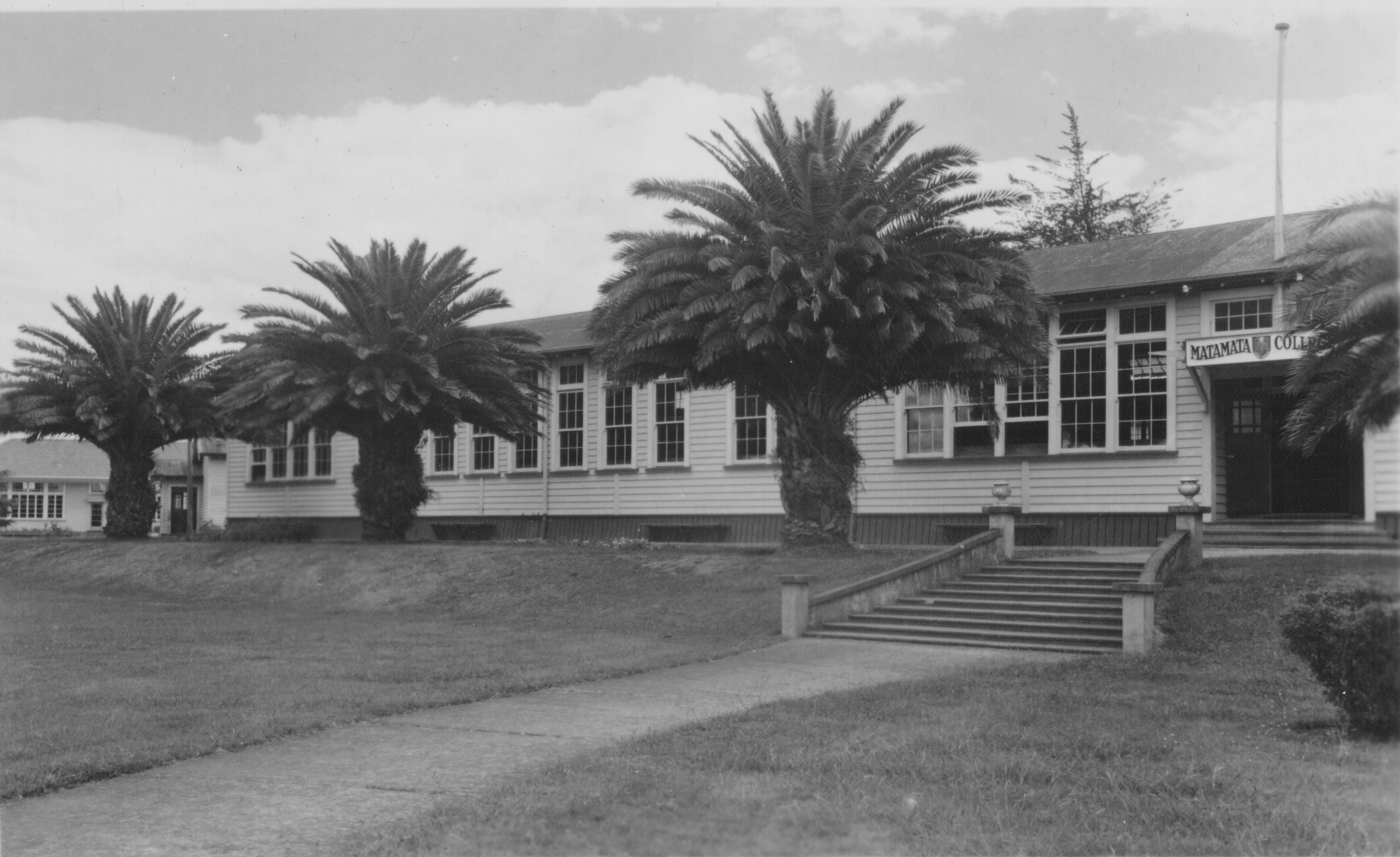
Front of Matamata College in the 1950s

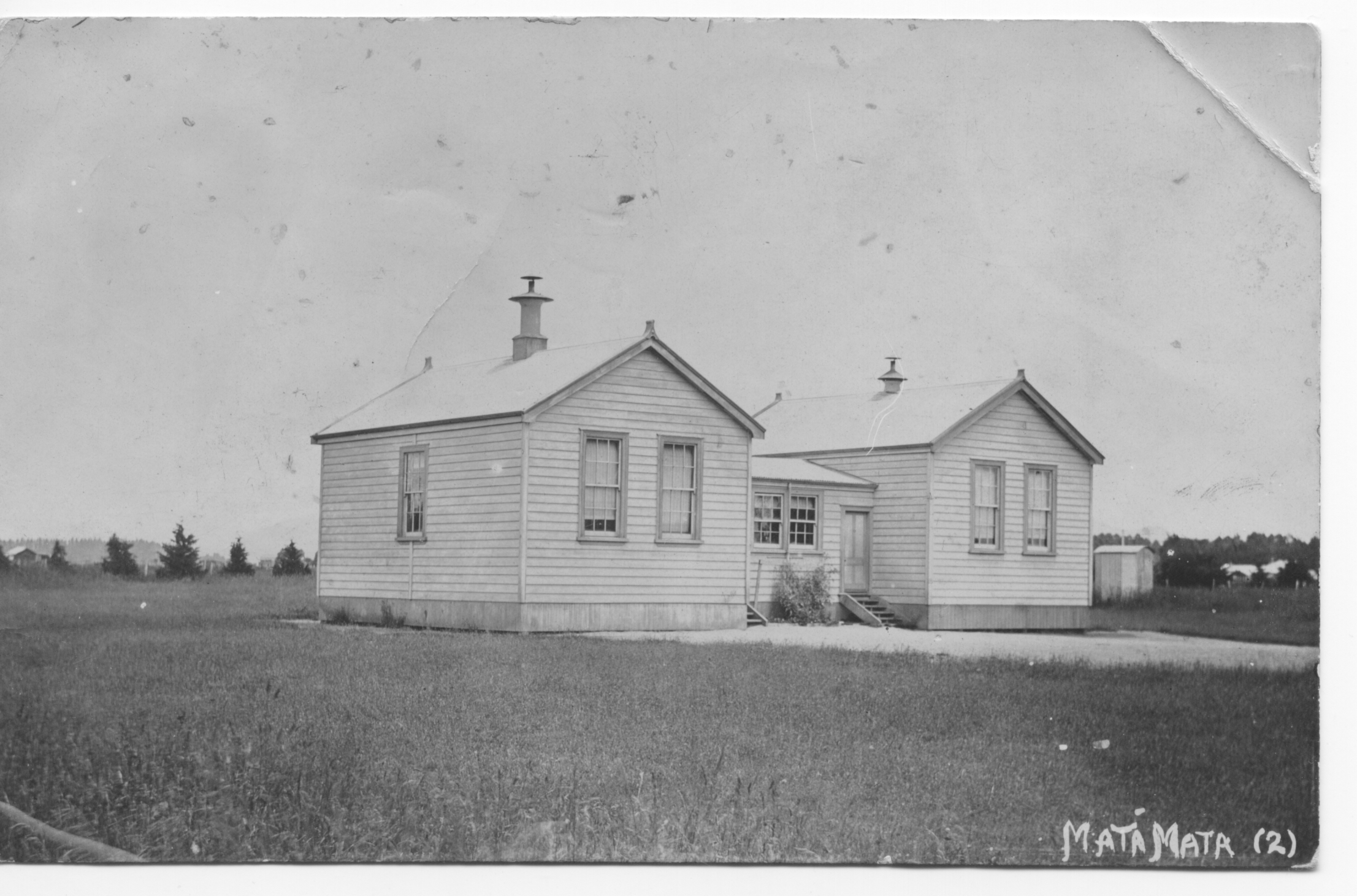
Matamata Public School from around 1909

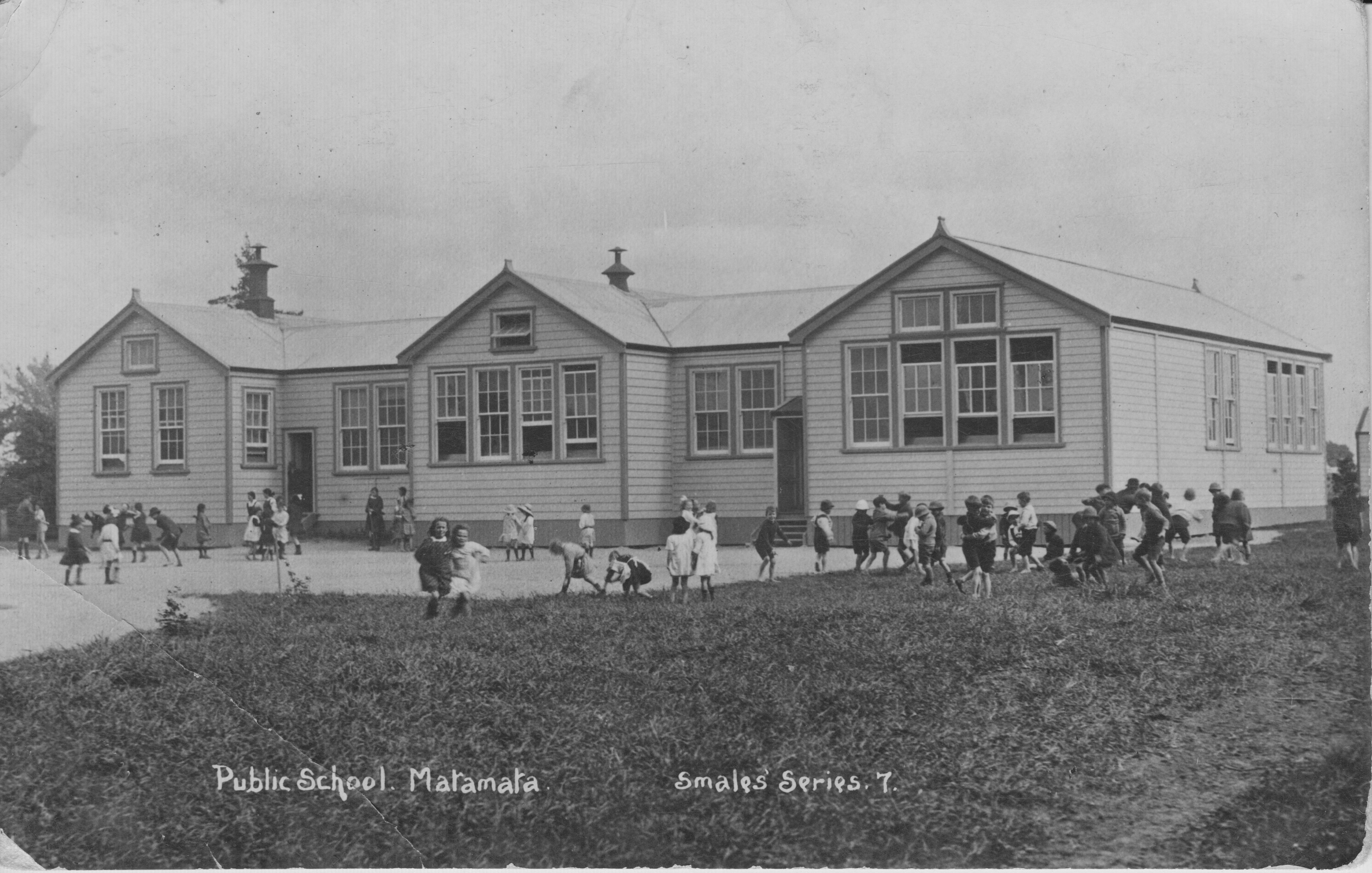
Matamata Public School around 1919

== Notable people ==
- Kristine Crabb
- Shane Dye
- Claudia Pond Eyley
- Casey Kopua
- Michael Moroney
- Dave O'Sullivan OBE
- Paul O'Sullivan
- Lance O'Sullivan ONZM
- Tim Mikkelson
- Hon Mike Rann CNZM
- Dame Patsy Reddy
- Tom Sainsbury
- Matthew Stanley
- Dame Catherine Tizard
- Kyle Wealleans

== Climate ==
Matamata features a mild oceanic climate (Cfb) with warmish summers and somewhat mild winters with cool nights, and moderate rainfall spread throughout the year. Rainfall peaks in winter and is the lowest in late summer.

Climate data for Matamata (1991–2020 normals, extremes 1999–present)
Month	Jan	Feb	Mar	Apr	May	Jun	Jul	Aug	Sep	Oct	Nov	Dec	Year
Record high °C (°F)	32.8 (91.0)	32.5 (90.5)	30.1 (86.2)	27.8 (82.0)	24.1 (75.4)	20.6 (69.1)	19.5 (67.1)	21.8 (71.2)	21.8 (71.2)	24.9 (76.8)	28.4 (83.1)	29.0 (84.2)	32.8 (91.0)
Mean maximum °C (°F)	28.7 (83.7)	28.9 (84.0)	27.3 (81.1)	24.5 (76.1)	21.8 (71.2)	18.0 (64.4)	17.1 (62.8)	18.1 (64.6)	19.9 (67.8)	21.5 (70.7)	24.7 (76.5)	26.5 (79.7)	29.6 (85.3)
Mean daily maximum °C (°F)	24.4 (75.9)	25.0 (77.0)	23.2 (73.8)	20.1 (68.2)	17.1 (62.8)	14.2 (57.6)	13.6 (56.5)	14.6 (58.3)	16.0 (60.8)	17.9 (64.2)	20.0 (68.0)	22.3 (72.1)	19.0 (66.3)
Daily mean °C (°F)	18.2 (64.8)	18.7 (65.7)	16.8 (62.2)	14.2 (57.6)	11.6 (52.9)	9.1 (48.4)	8.4 (47.1)	9.3 (48.7)	10.9 (51.6)	12.6 (54.7)	14.4 (57.9)	16.8 (62.2)	13.4 (56.2)
Mean daily minimum °C (°F)	11.9 (53.4)	12.4 (54.3)	10.5 (50.9)	8.3 (46.9)	6.2 (43.2)	4.0 (39.2)	3.2 (37.8)	3.9 (39.0)	5.7 (42.3)	7.4 (45.3)	8.9 (48.0)	11.3 (52.3)	7.8 (46.1)
Mean minimum °C (°F)	6.4 (43.5)	5.8 (42.4)	4.5 (40.1)	1.1 (34.0)	−1.1 (30.0)	−2.8 (27.0)	−3.4 (25.9)	−2.1 (28.2)	−0.9 (30.4)	0.7 (33.3)	2.4 (36.3)	5.3 (41.5)	−4.2 (24.4)
Record low °C (°F)	3.3 (37.9)	2.7 (36.9)	0.0 (32.0)	−4.3 (24.3)	−4.0 (24.8)	−5.3 (22.5)	−5.7 (21.7)	−5.0 (23.0)	−2.9 (26.8)	−2.4 (27.7)	0.5 (32.9)	3.3 (37.9)	−5.7 (21.7)
Average rainfall mm (inches)	81.9 (3.22)	59.0 (2.32)	58.8 (2.31)	98.1 (3.86)	108.5 (4.27)	104.7 (4.12)	98.4 (3.87)	83.8 (3.30)	105.5 (4.15)	81.9 (3.22)	76.4 (3.01)	114.1 (4.49)	1,071.1 (42.14)
Source: NIWA

== See also ==
- List of towns in New Zealand
- List of reduplicated New Zealand place names
