= Bruce Burnett =

New Zealand AIDS activist and educator

Bruce Burnett (16 November 1954, Avondale, Auckland – 1 June 1985) was an AIDS activist and educator influential in establishing the New Zealand AIDS Foundation and early educational programmes.

== Education and training to provide support for patients ==
Burnett studied architecture at the University of Auckland but did not complete his degree. After leaving university he travelled to Europe to study cuisine and returned to Auckland where he was involved in a number of cafes. In 1982 he moved to the United States, living in Berkeley and then in San Francisco. Here he trained as a volunteer for the Shanti Project, a community-based organisation that provided emotional and practical support to people living with life-threatening illnesses.

== Diagnosis with ARC ==
Burnett returned to New Zealand in November 1983 with swollen lymph glands and a persistent infection in his intestine. He had been diagnosed with ARC (AIDS related complex) while in the United States. On his return, he threw himself into AIDS education. The first New Zealand man who had contracted AIDS overseas and returned home died in Taranaki in February 1984. There was a vast amount of stigma surrounding the disease and as the Homosexual Law Reform bill had not yet been passed, it was hard for people to access information openly.

== Co-founder of the AIDS Support Network ==
In 1984, with Bill Logan and Phil Parkinson, Burnett established the AIDS Support Network, and also established the AIDS hotline. Burnett travelled New Zealand in a "one-man roadshow", delivering public talks.

In a March 1985 talk given in Wellington, Burnett said:

In a country like New Zealand where sexual activity is not talked about very freely or with much ease, and when you’re dealing with things like homosexuality there's even less ease.

When you’re dealing with a country where you can’t even educate people in schools about sex or sexually transmitted disease in case you put ideas into their heads, it makes it very difficult.

You do not have to be some drug-crazed, sex-possessed individual to catch AIDS, there are many cases of people who have caught AIDS on their first and second sexual contact.

So all of you out there who have been thinking well I’m not quite that promiscuous so I’m safe, forget it.

== Death and legacy ==
Burnett died of an AIDS-related illness on 1 June 1985. He was active in AIDS education right up to his death and succeeded in gaining the first government funding to set up the New Zealand AIDS Foundation. Its first clinic, opened in Auckland in July 1986, is named after him. In June 2022, the New Zealand AIDS Foundation rebranded as Burnett Foundation Aotearoa in honour of Burnett and others who were vital, but often not recognised, for their work for the cause.

Burnett's name is recorded on Block 12 of the New Zealand AIDS Memorial Quilt.

== Further information ==
- Recorded interview with Bruce Burnett, February 1985
- HIV and Coronavirus: Remembering Bruce Burnett and Li Wenliang
