= Punch (2022 film) =

2022 New Zealand film

- Directed by: Welby Ings
- Written by: Welby Ings
- Produced by: Robin Murphy; Catherine Fitzgerald
- Starring: Tim Roth
- Production companies: Robin Murphy Productions; Blueskin Films
- Distributed by: Vendetta Films
- Release date: 30 July 2022
- Country: New Zealand
- Language: English

Punch is a New Zealand sports and gay coming-of-age drama film written and directed by Welby Ings and starring Tim Roth. It is Ings' feature directorial debut.

== Plot ==
Stan is a former professional boxer. His son Jim decided to follow in his father's footsteps and becomes a boxer himself. Jim discovers that he is homosexual and develops a relationship with fellow teenager Whetu, an aspiring singer. Their relationship is seen negatively by almost everyone in their town; in particular, the town's males.

Whetu is severely beaten and raped by Jim's boxing promoter and the promoter's friends. Visiting Whetu at the hospital, Stan accepts that Jim and Whetu have a relationship and he later tells Jim that all that matters is Jim's happiness. After Whetu is released from the hospital, he and Jim get revenge at the promoter by blowing up the promoter's car.

Stan receives the news that he has terminal cancer as Jim begins to train for a fight which will determine the regional champion in Jim's boxing's weight division. Stan decides to hide his illness from his son so that his son can concentrate on the physical and mental preparation for the contest. But Jim's promoter, in retaliation for Jim and Whetu's exploding his car, decides that Jim must lose the bout and bets money against his protege, telling Jim about Stan's cancer in order to distract Jim.

The day of the title fight arrives, and Jim, pummeling his rival, looks over at the boxing ring's side and sees his father sitting there, watching the contest. Just as Jim is about to win the championship, Stan collapses. Wanting to be next to his dad, Jim leaps out of the ring, causing Jim to lose the fight by disqualification and his promoter to win the bet.

Whetu is then shown singing, having achieved his dream of becoming a singer. Jim stays in town, quitting his boxing career and following his dream of becoming a videographer. The film ends with Jim being seen editing a video tributing his time and relationship with Whetu.

== Cast ==
- Tim Roth as Stan
- Jordan Oosterhof as Jim
- Conan Hayes as Whetu
- Abigail Laurent as Chelsea
- Connor Johnston as Colin
- Sage Klein as Amber
- Wilson Downes as Riley

== Production ==
Production on the film commenced in Auckland, New Zealand, in November 2020. In July 2021, it was announced that production on the film wrapped.

== Release ==
The film premiered at the 2022 New Zealand International Film Festival.

== Reception ==
The film has a 78% rating on Rotten Tomatoes based on 19 reviews.
