= Vincent Burke (producer) =

NZ Television and Film Producer (1952–2022)

- Born: Eric Vincent Burke; 14 February 1952; Waimate, New Zealand
- Died: 17 February 2022 (aged 70); Wellington, New Zealand
- Occupations: Television and film producer
- Years active: 1988–2022

Eric Vincent Burke (14 February 1952 – 17 February 2022) was a New Zealand television and film producer. Burke was the founder of Top Shelf Productions which was established in 1988. With a career spanning thirty years, Burke was noted for his documentary work and television productions that addressed social issues and everyday life.

== Early life and education ==
Burke was born in Waimate, in the South Island of New Zealand. His family moved to Tokoroa when he was ten and later to Hamilton. He attended Hamilton Boys' High School and Victoria University of Wellington, graduating with a BA (Hons) degree in music. After that he grew an interest in research and arts management.

== Career ==
With his work arranging tours for theatre groups and bands for various universities and working as an arts administrator, Burke joined the New Zealand Film Commission as a policy advisor and researcher.

Burke launched the New Zealand television production company, Top Shelf Productions, in 1988, which he ran until closing it down in 2019. He raised his own finance in the company to fund his first short film, Gordon Bennett, which was released in 1989.

Burke's first documentary, I Want to Die at Home, was released in 1990. The documentary won a Jury Award at the Montreal Women's Festival in 1991. He made seven more films about death and dying, which were used in nurses' training. All About Eve, a documentary about the HIV-infected child Eve van Grafhorst was released in 1994.

In 1995, Cinema of Unease was released, covering the beginnings of New Zealand films around this time. Burke was the executive producer and it won Best Documentary at the 1996 New Zealand Film Awards.

During the 1990s, Burke expanded further with Top Shelf Productions, producing shows and documentaries such as Target, An Immigrant Nation and Flatmates. During the early 2000s, Top Shelf Productions released the show Making New Zealand.

Burke and Laurie Clarke founded the free-to-air New Zealand TV channel, Choice TV, in late 2011. In 2012, Burke was appointed one of the directors and the channel was launched on 28 April 2012. It was sold to Blue Ant Media in 2014, then to Discovery New Zealand in 2019. The channel was later changed to eden.

In the last few years of his life, Burke worked as an executive producer at the Avalon studios in Lower Hutt.

== Selected credits ==
- Gordon Bennett (1989)
- I Want To Die At Home (1990)
- Sisters of the River (1992)
- An Immigrant Nation (1994-1996)
- All About Eve (1994)
- Flight of the Albatross (1995)
- Velvet Dreams (1997)
- Flatmates (1997)
- Target (1999-2012)
- Frontier of Dreams (2003-2004)
- 100 Men (2017)
- TEAM TIBET - Home away from Home (2017)

== Personal life ==
Burke was married to, and later divorced from, Monique Oomen who was a TVNZ current affairs director.

He died in Wellington on 17 February 2022 from oesophageal cancer.
