= List of Peer-led HIV testing organisations in New Zealand =

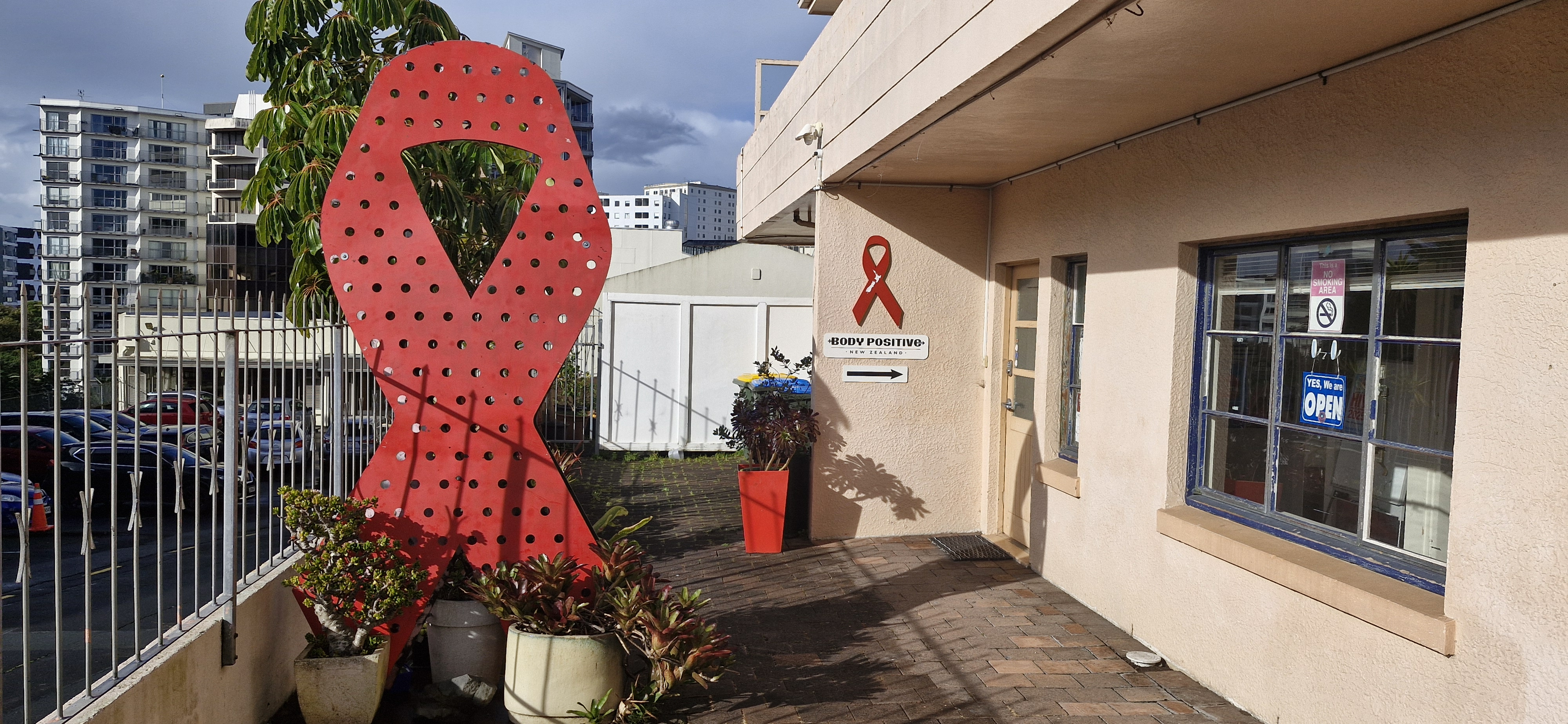
Body Positive 1/3 Poynton Terrace, Auckland CBD, off Pitt Street near Karangahape Road

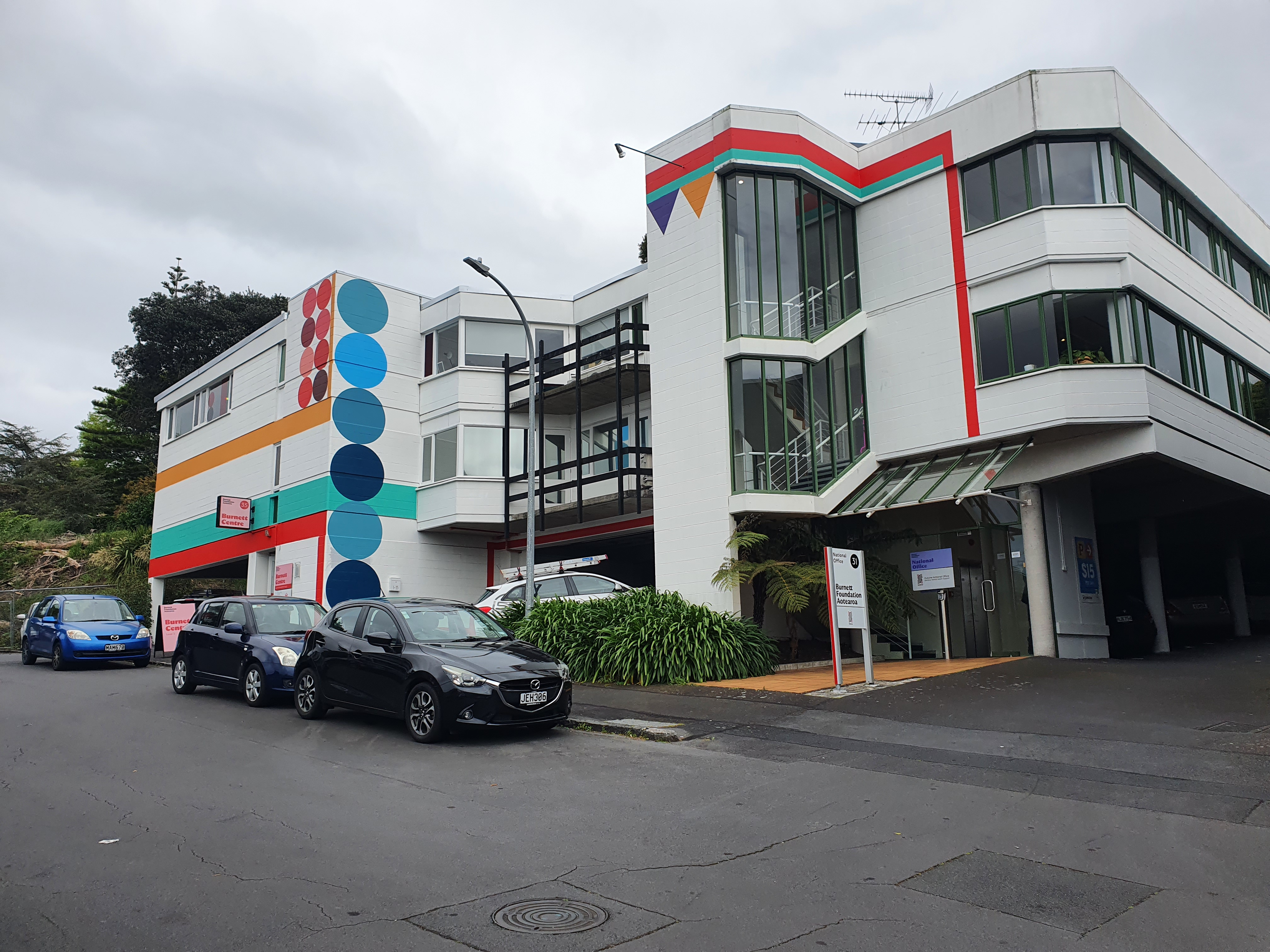
The Burnett Foundation Aotearoa and Positive Women Inc National offices in Auckland

This List of Peer-led HIV testing organisations in New Zealand shows the New Zealand organisations that provide Rapid HIV testing done by members of the community and not by clinical professionals. This does not include organisations like Auckland Sexual Health Services (ASHS) as this is clinically led.This is an important service as studies shows that peer-led organisations have proven to be effective with HIV testing.

== Peer-led HIV testing organisations ==
| Name | Kaupapa/Focus/Communities | Location | Established | Website | Reference |
|---|---|---|---|---|---|
| Aotearoa Drug Information Outreach | Needle Exchange | Auckland | 1989 | | |
| Aotearoa New Zealand Sex Workers' Collective; Formerly known as New Zealand Prostitutes Collective | Sex worker | Auckland CBD; Tauranga; Wellington; Christchurch | 1987 | | |
| Burnett Foundation Aotearoa; Formerly known as New Zealand AIDS Foundation | Rainbow Community | Auckland CBD; Wellington; Christchurch | 1985 | | |
| Body Positive | People living with HIV; Rainbow Community | Auckland CBD | 1980s | | |
| Positive Women Inc | Women; Heterosexual community | Auckland CBD | 1990 | | |
| Te Taenga Mai; As part of Positive Women inc | Refugee, Migrants and Asylum seeker | Auckland CBD | 2024 | | |
| Toitū te Ao | Maori Community | Waikato; Bay of Plenty | 2020 | | |
