= International Association for Impact Assessment =

International organization

The International Association for Impact Assessment (IAIA) is an international association of professionals involved with impact assessment, including both social impact assessment and environmental impact assessment.

== History ==
The United States' National Environmental Policy Act (NEPA) was signed into law on 1 January 1970. It requires federal agencies to integrate environmental values into their decision-making processes by considering the environmental impacts of their proposed actions and reasonable alternatives to those actions. To meet NEPA requirements, U.S. federal agencies prepare a detailed statement known as an Environmental Impact Statement (EIS). It was the enforcement of this piece of legislation that provided the impetus for the creation of IAIA.

In 1980, Charlie Wolf, Fred Rossini, and Alan Porter chaired an all-day session on integrated impact assessment for the American Association for the Advancement of Science's (AAAS) annual conference in San Francisco.

During one of the sessions at the 1980 AAAS conference, Rossini, Porter, and Wolf discussed creating an impact assessment association. The discussion continued over dinner in Chinatown. At the end of the meal, fortune cookies were served. The piece of paper inside Wolf's cookie read "you will do well to expand your business" – and the decision to begin the International Association for Impact Assessment was made. The intent was to bring together all who were responsible for and figuring out how to conduct assessments which would meet the NEPA requirements for Environmental Impact Assessment.

IAIA was incorporated in 1980 in the state of Georgia, US, where Porter lived and worked. Its first meeting was held in Toronto, Ontario, Canada, in January 1981. Porter was the first executive director, serving from 1981 to 1988. Maurie Voland of Belhaven, North Carolina, US, took over as executive director in 1988 and served in a part-time position until 1995. The headquarters of IAIA moved to North Dakota State University (NDSU) in Fargo, North Dakota, in 1995, when the board appointed Rita Hamm as its executive director. In 1999, the IAIA Headquarters moved off of the NDSU campus to its current independent location at 1330 23rd Street South, Suite C, Fargo, North Dakota, US.

== Organization ==
The IAIA headquarter operates with six full-time employees.

=== Direct membership ===
IAIA has members from over 120 countries, and anybody can join as a member and/or renew membership online. Individual membership costs $55 for students and $110 for other individuals. Membership comes with a subscription to the IAPA Journal and the IAIA Newsletter, as well as other benefits.

=== Affiliates ===
IAIA has affiliates in over ten countries, including Cameroon, Poland, Germany, Ghana, Italy, South Korea, Mozambique, New Zealand, Nigeria, Portugal, South Africa, Spain, and Canada (multiple affiliates).

== Publications ==
IAIA publishes Impact Assessment and Project Appraisal, a quarterly journal comprising peer-reviewed research articles, professional practice articles, and book reviews of recently published titles. IAIA also publishes a newsletter and other downloadable publications.

== Events ==
The Annual Conference of the International Association for Impact Assessment has been held around 40 times.

== Reception and impact ==
The IAIA has been cited by United States Government agencies in their evaluation of the impact of various activities. For instance, the United States Department of Energy and the United States Environmental Protection Agency both list the IAIA as a non-profit organization to consult for environmental impact assessment. IAIA prepared a monograph on social impact assessment for the National Marine Fisheries Service in 1993/1994. Delaware Health and Social Services cited an IAIA paper in its fact sheet on health impact assessment.

The World Health Organization lists the IAIA among the "Other organizational links" in the arena of impact assessment. WHO and IAIA also co-sponsored a conference on health impact assessment. Experts from the International Association for Impact Assessment also played an important role in designing the World Bank's Strategic Environmental Assessment (SEA) materials.
