= Richard Orjis =

New Zealand artist and art photographer

Richard Orjis (born 1979) is a New Zealand artist based in Melbourne, Australia.

== Biography ==
Orjis was born in Whanganui, New Zealand and studied at the Auckland University of Technology (AUT), earning a BVA in 2001. He studied at Carnegie Mellon University, in Pittsburgh, before returning to New Zealand and studying for an MFA from the Elam School of Fine Art, at the University of Auckland, graduating in 2006. In 2021 Orjis completed a PhD at AUT. The title of his doctoral thesis was Below, Behind, Across: Bttm Methodology and Queer Representation in Contemporary Art, and one of his advisors was Welby Ings. While living in New York, Orjis worked for photographer and film maker David LaChapelle and collaborated on several projects with Cuban American artist Anthony Goicolea.

== Work ==
All his work is designed to illustrated non-existent, shadowy social groups, engaged in ambiguous activity. They appear to be a group of Europeans who have gone feral in a tropical jungle. Covered wholly or partially in mud, they stare dully out at the camera through elaborate necklaces and garlands of brightly coloured, sensuous flowers. Phallic and vulval forms dominate the arrangements (pitcher plants and orchids). The figures are passive and unthreatening, but also generate frissons of evil and madness and exert a horrid fascination. Mud was the medium of Orjis' graduation show in 2006, My Empire of Dirt. Using mud and water, he did a fey series of works on paper depicting semi-clad figures singly and in groups. Some scenes were set in woodland, and the heads of some figures seemed to have morphed into grotesque wood galls while others wore helmets.

== Exhibitions ==
2009

- The Enchanted Garden, Art Gallery Toi o Tamaki, NZ
- Richard Orjis, Starkwhite Gallery, Auckland, NZ*
- Recent: Ten Contemporary NZ Photographers, Tauranga Art Gallery, NZ
- Animal Farm: 4 Legs Good, Sargeant Gallery, Whanganui, NZ
- Flora: Growth Between Neighbours, Victoria University, Melbourne, Australia
- Seen this Century, Judith Anderson Gallery, Hastings, NZ

2008

- little black flower grow, in the sky, Luis Adelantado, Valencia, Spain*
- YES, Te Tuhi Centre for Arts, Auckland, NZ*
- Richard Orjis, Starkwhite, Auckland, NZ*
- Landslide, McNamara Gallery, Whanganui, NZ*
- Welcome to the Jungle, The Physic Room, Christchurch, NZ*
- The Maui Destiny, The Suter Te Aratoi o Whakatu, Nelson, NZ

2007

- Vice, Luis Adelantado, Miami, USA
- My Empire of Dirt: Selected works on paper, Roger Williams Contemporary, Auckland, NZ*
- Picnics and Revolutions, Roger Williams Contemporary, Auckland, NZ
- Richard Orjis / Todd Stratton, Roger Williams Contemporary, Auckland, NZ
- Art is 4 Lovers, Butterfly Net, Auckland, NZ
- Jewellery out of Context: an exhibition of New Zealand artists / curated by Dr Carole Sheperd and Peer Deckers, Object Space, Auckland, NZ
- Fat of the Land, Creative New Zealand, Auckland, NZ
- Asian at the Wheel, Gus Fisher Gallery, The University of Auckland, Auckland, NZ

2006

- The New Situationists, City Gallery, Wellington, NZ
- The New Situationists, Canary Gallery, Auckland, NZ
- The Orchid Show, Mount Street, Auckland, NZ
- Arquivar Tormentas, Centro Galego De Arte Contemporanea, Santiago, Spain
- Dep_art_ment, Auckland, New Zealand*
- Summer Exhibition, Roger Williams Contemporary, Auckland, NZ

2005

- Me, Me, Me, Room 103, Auckland, New Zealand
- Bring Your Caddy, Stanbeth House, Auckland, New Zealand
- Dep_art_ment, Auckland, New Zealand*

2004

- Richard Orjis, Galeria Luis Adelantado, Valencia, Spain*
- Richard Orjis, Galeria Llucia Homs, Barcelona, Spain*

2003

- In Faccia Al Mondo 'Contemporary Portraits in Photography', The Museum of Contemporary Art of Villa Croce, Genoa, Italy
- Angst, RARE, New York City
- Group Show, Galeria Luis Adelantado, Valencia, Spain

(*denotes solo shows)

== Collections ==
- The Film Archive, Wellington, NZ
- Jenny Gibbs Collection, Auckland, NZ
- The Ministry of Education, Culture and Sport Collection, Madrid, Spain
- The University of Auckland Art Collection, Auckland, NZ
- Wallace Trust Collection, Auckland, NZ

== Bibliography ==
– Arevalo, Pilar, – 'Narcissist, artist or just taking the piss?', Oyster, Issue 43, December/January 2003, pp. 48–51

– Battersby, Shandelle, -'Richard Orjis, Artists and Mud Fan', Time Out, The New Zealand Herald, 17–23 May 2007, p. 5

– Brown, Warwick,-'Seen This Century:100 Contemporary New Zealand Artists’, Godwit, Random House, 2009, pp. 304–307

– Capdevilla, Marta, – ‘Up-State’, Suite, 29, October 2004, p. 64

– Chang, Lulu, – ‘ The Garden of Unearthly Delight’, Soma, Volume 21.4, May/June 2007, p. 30

– Coney, Hamish, -‘Future Schlock: An old fogey looks at the work of today’s yoof’, Ideolog, #7, January – February 2007, p. 95 or http://idealog.co.nz/magazine/January-February-2007/workshop/future-schlock

– ‘Gallery’, Black, No 7, Summer 2007/08, p. 176 (Artists Page)

– Hall, Oliver, – ‘International Achiever’, Express, 25 April – 1 May 2007, pp. 10–11

– Hamilton, Summer, – ‘Auckland Art Fair 07’, KiaOra, May 2007, p72

– Laird, Tessa, -‘Secrets of the Soil: Richard Orjis and his Empire of Dirt’, White Fungus, Issue 8, 2007, pp. 34–41

– Lingard, Jason, – ‘Richard Orjis’, Nothing Magazine, Issue 11 2007 http://www.nothingmag.com/_issue11/index.html

– McNaughton, Harry, ‘ Richard Orjis’, No. Magazine, Issue 1, March 2008, pp. 18–19

– Mogutin, Slava, -‘Anthony et Richard’, TETU, No 88, April 2004, p. 34–35

– Mudie, Ella, -‘ The Dark side: Richard Orjis’, Dazed and Confused Aus/NZ, Volume 1 Issue 3 2007, p. 137

– Northcross, Wayne, – ‘ Razzle-Basel’, Instinct, Vol 6 Issue 2, February 2003, p. 16

– Olveira, Manuel, – ‘A Story with a viewpoint’, Arquivar Tormentas, Centro Galego De Arte Contemporanea, Santiago, Spain, pp. 27–31

– Orjis, Richard, – ‘Momento Mori’, New Zealand Home & Entertaining, April/May 2006, pp. 62–69

– Orjis, Richard – ‘Coal Choir’, No Magazine, Issue 2 2008, pp. 61–69

– Pickens, Robyn,- ‘Expressions of Contradictions’, The Press, Christchurch, Wednesday, 16 April 2008, p.D5

– Real Art Trust Staff, – ‘Real Art Roadshow: The Book’, Real Art Charitable Trust, 2009, pp. 162–163

– Serrat, Carlos, ‘ Contemporary Paganism’, The Creator Studio’, # 11 Rituals, April 2008, pp. 4–13

– Suau, Christina, – ‘Richard Orjis’, ELLE, Spain, No. 197, February 2003, p. 72

– Tabron, Delaney, – ‘Richard Orjis’, Pavement, Summer 2004/2005, Issue 66, p. 43

– Ventur, Conrad, -‘NYC Photographers’, Useless Magazine, Vol 1 No 1, Fall/Winter 2004, p. 46

– Williams, Melinda, – ‘Hip to be square’, Sunday Life and View, Herald on Sunday, 3–9 April 2005, pp. 6–8
