= Impact Assessment and Project Appraisal =

- Discipline: Impact assessment
- Language: English
- Edited by: Thomas Fischer

Publication details
- Former names: Impact Assessment; Project Appraisal
- History: 1982–present
- Publisher: Taylor and Francis
- Frequency: Bimonthly
- Impact factor: 1.551 (2019)

Standard abbreviations
- ISO 4: Impact Assess. Proj. Apprais.

Indexing
- ISSN: 1471-5465 (print); 1461-5517 (web)
- LCCN: 2019204211
- OCLC no.: 784307632

Links
- Journal homepage

Impact Assessment and Project Appraisal is a scientific journal in the area of impact assessment, published by Taylor and Francis. The journal is associated with the organization International Association for Impact Assessment. It is edited by Thomas Fischer from University of Liverpool.

The journal is a continuation of Impact Assessment (1982–1997) and Project Appraisal (1986–1997).

== Abstracting and indexing ==
The journal is indexed and abstracted in the following bibliographic databases:

- ABI/INFORM
- Academic Search Premier
- Business Source Elite
- Business Source Premier
- CAB Abstracts
- Environment Index
- GEOBASE
- IBZ Online
- International Bibliography of the Social Sciences
- PAIS International
- Political Science Complete
- Pollution Abstracts
- Public Affairs Index
- Scopus
- Social Sciences Citation Index
- Worldwide Political Science Abstracts

According to the Journal Citation Reports, the journal has a 2019 impact factor of 1.551.
