= Body Positive =

HIV/AIDS support organisation in New Zealand

Body Positive Inc.
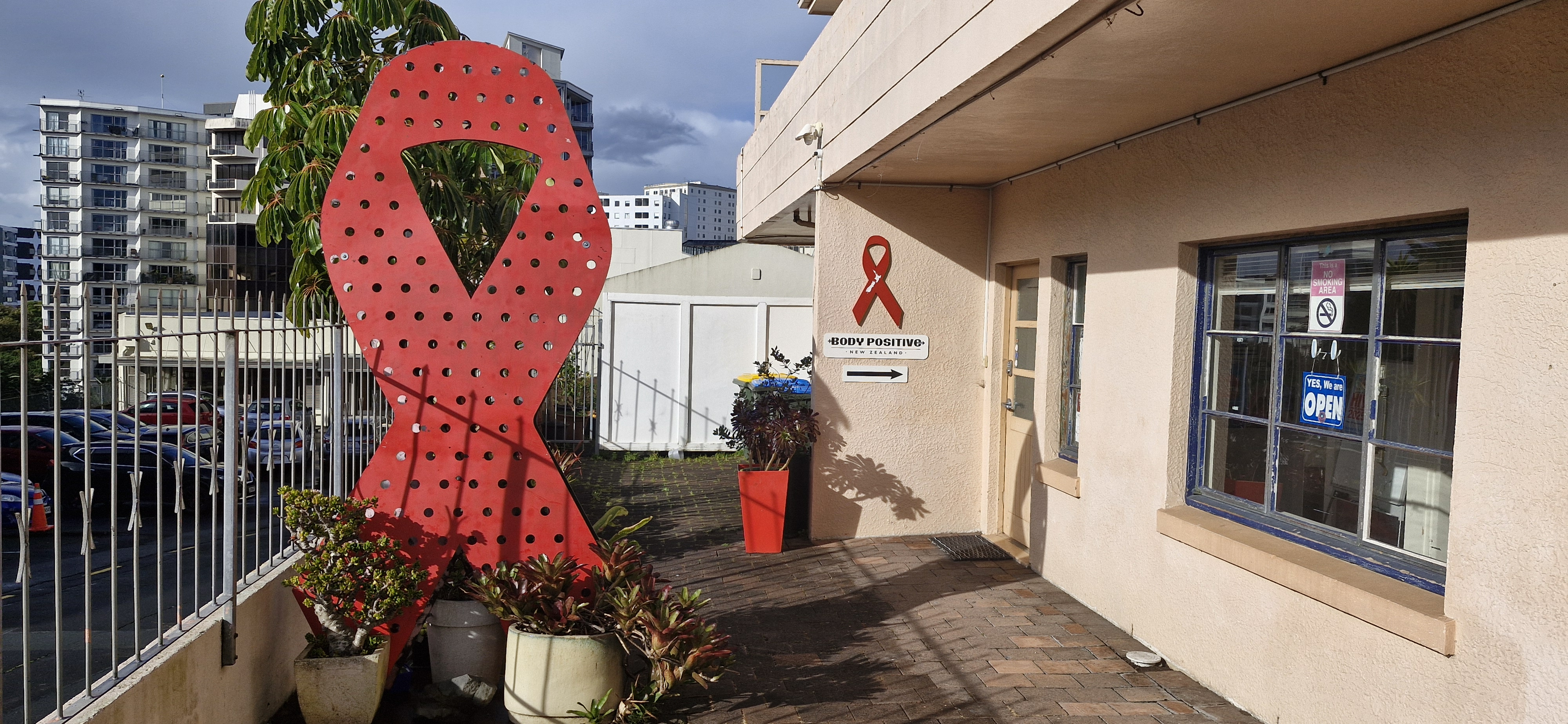
- Body Positive 1/3 Poynton Terrace, Auckland CBD
- Abbreviation: BP
- Formation: 1980s
- Type: Nonprofit
- Legal status: charity
- Purpose: HIV/AIDS
- Headquarters: Body Positive
- Location: Auckland, New Zealand
- Coordinates: 36.856779724099646°S 174.75945190325618°E
- Origins: New Zealand
- Services: Drop-In Centre; Free Rapid HIV Testing; HIV+ Peer Navigation; Positive Health; WINZ Support; Foodbank; Wellness Fund; Circle of Friends Memorial; Sexual Health Clinic; Massage Therapy; The Positive Speakers’ Bureau; HIV Essentials Online Course
- Official language: English
- Key people: Tawhanga Nopera (Chairperson); Mark Fisher (Executive Director); Bruce Kilmister (retired CEO)
- Website: bodypositive.org.nz

Body Positive Incorporated (established in 1980s) peer support organisation providing care and support to all people living with HIV/AIDS in New Zealand, as well as advocating and combat stigma surrounding HIV.

== Formation and leadership ==
Body Positive was formed during the 1980s, with their clinic opening in 1992 and becoming an official charity and an incorporated society in 1994. CEO Bruce Kilmister was the first leader of Body Positive after it became incorporated. In 2014, Kilmister retired as CEO and was replaced by executive director, Mark Fisher who been involved with the HIV sector since 1992 in multiple countries including New Zealand, Australia and Canada. Bruce Kilmister would eventually return as chairperson of the board. As of 2024, Dr Tawhanga Nopera is the chairperson of the board.

=== Early work ===
In 1987, Body Positive created a document called "The Rights of People with AIDS" which includes the right to express yourself sexually. At around this time Body Positive were creating guidelines for HIV positive people on their responsibilities to the community.

During Bruce Kilmister's run as CEO, he did significant amount of work to make HIV medication more available including for 30 years making flights to Australia and Thailand to bring back to New Zealand HIV medication when the drugs were either not available or too expensive to obtain in New Zealand.

=== Wellington office ===
In 2013, Body Positive opened their second office in Wellington. Due to lack of funding, the office in Wellington had to close in 2015.

=== New Zealand Order of Merit ===
Both Kilmister and Fisher have been awarded as Member of New Zealand Order of Merit for their contribution to the HIV and rainbow community, as well as their long service to Body Positive. Kilmister was awarded in 2001. Fisher was award in October 2026.

Executive Director Mark Fisher MNZM at his Investiture ceremony 1 October 2026 with Dame Alcyion Cynthia Kiro

== Services and events ==
=== National HIV Treatment Seminar ===
Body Positive hosts annual National HIV Treatment Seminars which gives an update on the latest treatments, HIV and AIDS epidemiology report, and what is happening in the HIV sector. The Seminar is open to the public to register, as well as, having a clinical component to medical staff.

=== Men's retreat ===
Body Positive host annual men's retreat for HIV positive people so they can develop a support network and to create a safe and supportive environment for HIV positive men.

=== Auckland’s Puawai Festival ===
In 2015, the first Auckland's Puawai Festival was held over a six-day period to empower people living with HIV. The festival was a collaboration between Body Positive, Positive Women Inc, Borni Te Rongopai Tukiwaho and in the later events with the New Zealand Aids Foundation (now known as Burnett Foundation). The event came about when Body Positive approached Borni Te Rongopai Tukiwaho through performance and art. The festival was held annual, generally near World AIDS Day, however, the festival has not happened since the COVID pandemic.

=== SING! ===
In late 2019 and early 2020, Body Positive created a community led choir which was part of World AIDS Day and the Auckland Pride Festival.

=== HIV and STI Peer testing ===
Body Positive offer a range of services including rapid HIV and Syphilis testing and a range of STI testing. This is part of their Peer-Led testing program with people who are either HIV positive or part of the rainbow community provide testing to the community. In 2025, Body Positive announced that they evolved their services to a full Sexual health check with sexual health testing that provides same day results as well as same day treatment.

=== AIDS Candlelight Memorial Service ===
Since 1983, Body Positive has been hosting an annual Candlelight Memorial Service for those who died from AIDS related deaths, in both Auckland and Wellington.

== Politics and advocacy ==
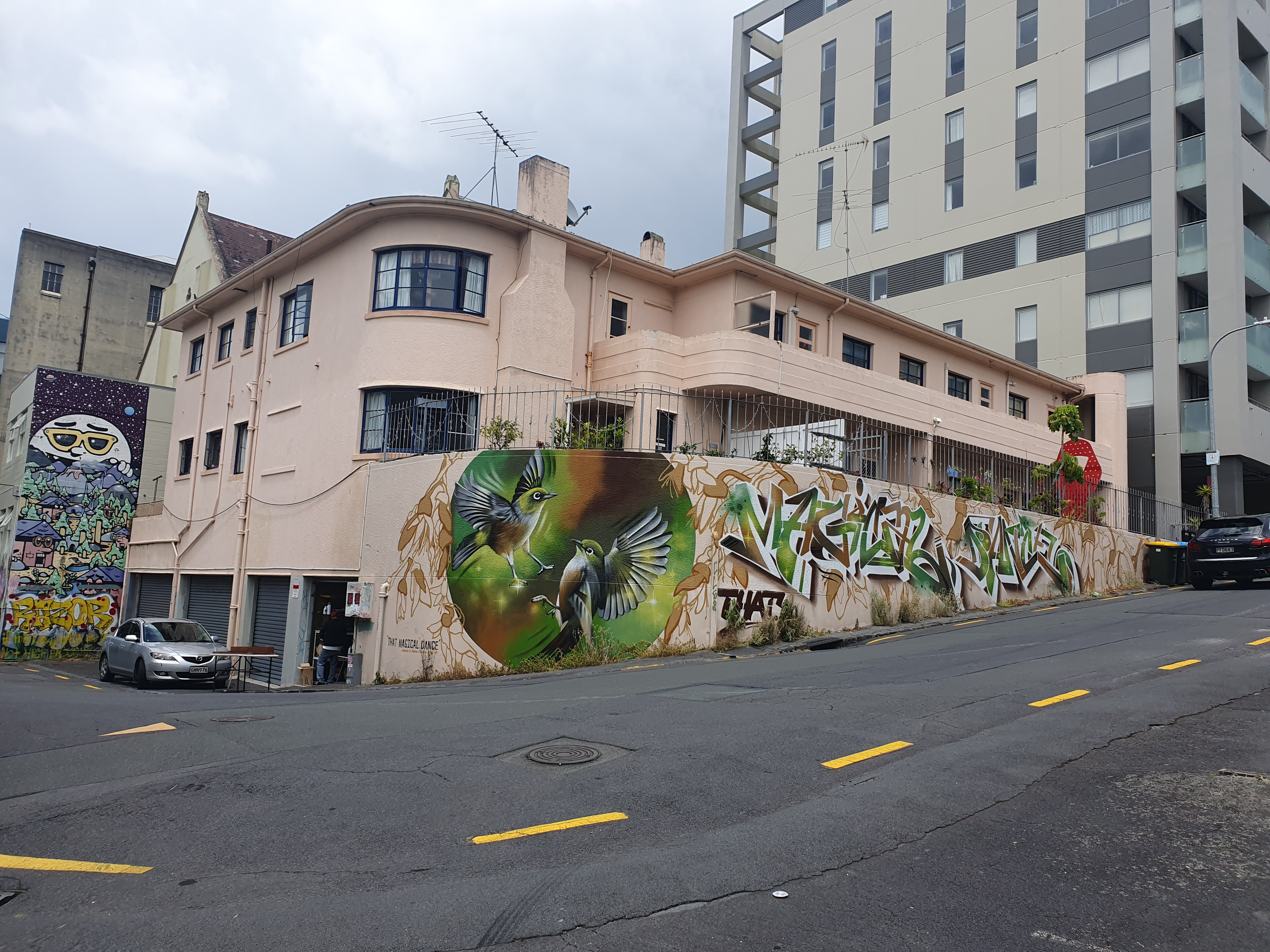
Mural on Body Positive called "That Magical Dance"

Politician Fran Wilde who introduced the Homosexual Law Reform Act 1986 in parliament, credited Bruce Kilmister for campaign resourcing and believed without the integral work that Kilmister did, the bill would not have passed in 1986.

In 2015, Body Positive was among OUTLineNZ, the Charlotte Museum, the Gay Auckland Business Association, Auckland Pride Festival Inc and the Rainbow Tick to make 5 minute speeches to the Auckland Council's Community Development and Safety Committee in aims to create a rainbow advisory board in Auckland Council. The committee voted in favour of creating a rainbow advisory board.

=== Prep and PeP ===
Body Positive advocates the accessibility of PreP and PeP for everyone. From 2020, Body Positive offered PreP who people who quickly need it. In 2022, Pharmac will expand the availability of pre-exposure prophylaxis (PrEP) and post-exposure prophylaxis (PEP) for preventing HIV, which Mark Fisher says "significant step toward the elimination of HIV transmission in Aotearoa". Today, Body Positive advocates for PreP to be normalised and more available for those who need it.

=== Poppers ===
In January 2020, the New Zealand's Medicines Classification Authority recommended to Medsafe that Alkyl nitrite only be available if prescribed by a doctor and not by wholesalers and suppliers, making it hard for people to purchase poppers. In March 2020, Medsafe accepted the recommendation. Mark Fisher and Body Positive took a strong stance against the ban, as it is an important part of gay and bi men's sex life. Fisher said "This ban has been implemented without any consideration for the people that it effects and has criminalised our communities overnight. This is not harm reduction – it is prohibition." Coincidentally this comes at a time where United Kingdom legalised Poppers. As of 2023, the New Zealand Ministry of Health has no plans on reinstating legal sale of poppers.

=== COVID and HIV ===
In 2021, Body Positive advocated to have HIV Positive people to be moved up on the priority list for COVID-19 vaccinations as people living with HIV have significant immunosuppression and are at risk of getting very sick from COVID-19. Body Positive would further criticise the New Zealand Government as Australia would prioritise people living with HIV and New Zealand does not.

=== Positive sperm bank ===
In 2019, Body Positive, New Zealand Aids Foundation and Positive Women Inc launched a sperm bank called Sperm Positive for HIV-positive people to donate. This is the first of its kind in the world, which received significant media attention across the world. On January 27, 2021, Amy was born who became the first ever baby to be born from a HIV sperm bank. As part of the Campaign, a picture book was released called The Baby who Changed the world. The campaign won a multiple awards at the Cannes Festival of Creativity.

=== Other Campaigns ===
In 2018, Body Positive began advocate for a Pride centre, a community hub for the rainbow community. The vision of the centre would have advocacy groups, a café, a sexual health clinic, counselling rooms, a library, exhibition spaces, and meeting rooms.

In 2018, Body Positive introduced the Undetectable = Untransmittable (U = U) campaign to New Zealand. Body Positive has been a strong advocate U = U.

In 2022, Body Positive released their "I’m Healthy, and I Live with HIV" campaign to highlight that people who are HIV Positive can, and should, live quality, healthy lives, as part of their battle against stigma and discrimination.

In 2024, Body Positive ran a campaign on their website called "Welcome to New Zealand" to assist in HIV Positive people to move to New Zealand by providing information and facts. This comes after the Labour government changed the rules in 2021 for HIV Positive people wanting to immigrate to New Zealand.

In 2025, HIV Self testing kits were made available in Pharmacies in New Zealand. Body Positive welcomes the tests being in pharmacies and believe it is a step in the right direction.

Body Positive is against the ban of gay men giving blood in New Zealand and should move toward what happening in other countries like England, Wales, Scotland, Canada and The United States where they do individualised risk assessments for every donor, making it easier for gay men to donate.

== Bibliography ==
Picture book

- The Baby Who Changed the World (art by Tim Wilde, Body Positive, Positive Women Inc, 2021)

== See also ==
- Burnett Foundation Aotearoa
- Positive Women Inc
- List of Peer-led HIV testing organisations in New Zealand
