= Flatmates (New Zealand TV series) =

New Zealand reality television

- Country of origin: New Zealand
- No. of episodes: 5

Production
- Executive producer: Geoff Steven
- Producers: Vincent Burke; Louise Fisher
- Production company: Top Shelf Productions

Original release
- Network: TV4
- Release: 1997

Flatmates is a New Zealand reality show. It followed the lives of several house friends while they were living under the same roof. The show was broadcast on the now-defunct channel TV4 in 1997, and ran for two seasons with the follow-up, More Flatmates. The show was produced by Top Shelf Productions and funded by NZ On Air. The show was a finalist for the New Zealand television awards in 1998.
