= Positive Women Inc =

HIV/AIDS peer support organisation

Positive Women Inc.
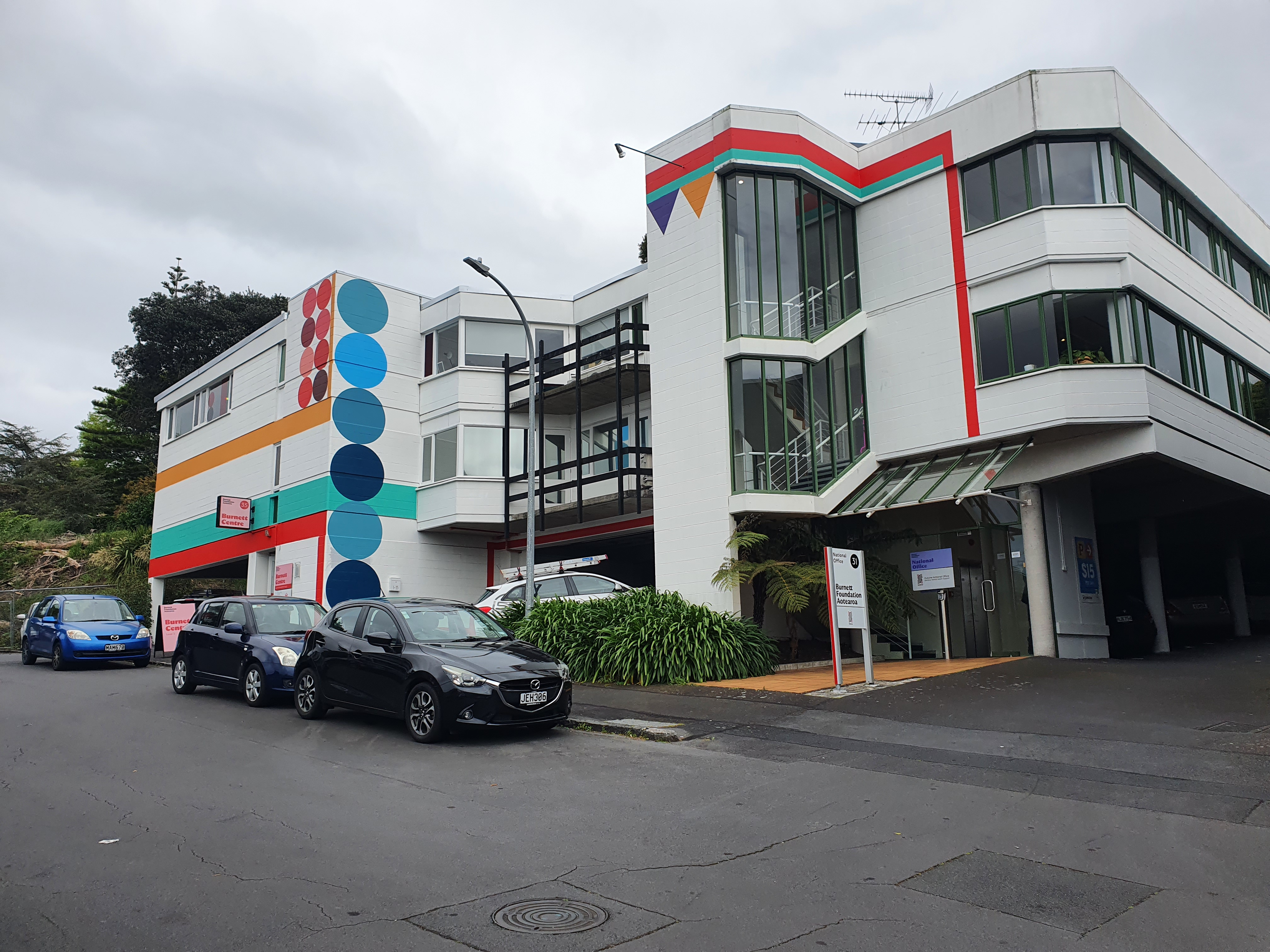
- Positive Women Inc located in The Burnett Foundation Aotearoa national office building in Auckland
- Abbreviation: PWI
- Formation: 1990
- Type: Nonprofit
- Legal status: Charity
- Purpose: HIV/AIDS
- Headquarters: Positive Women
- Location: Auckland, New Zealand
- Coordinates: 36.8474815°S 174.7488798°E
- Origins: New Zealand
- Services: Drop-In Centre; Free Rapid HIV Testing; HIV+ Peer Navigation; Bi-monthly newsletter Annual retreat for women living with HIV; Advice and referral service Family/whānau hui every two years Teen camp Positive Speakers’ Bureau training Peer support groups and workshops
- Official language: English
- Key people: Jane Bruning (National Coordinator)
- Website: positivewomen.org.nz

Positive Women Incorporated (established in 1990) is a peer support organisation that provides care and support to women and heterosexual people living with HIV/AIDS in New Zealand. They also aim to combat stigma surrounding HIV.

== Formation and leadership ==
Positive Women was formed when women in New Zealand began to test positive for HIV during the 1980s. Two social workers, Judith Ackroyd and Suzi Morrison, who worked for the Community AIDS Resource Team (CART) at Auckland Hospital, created a peer support group which met on a monthly basis. Eventually Positive Women grew to what it is today.

Positive Women was formed in 1990, however, it became an incorporated society and non-profit organisation in 2001. In 2003, the two volunteer coordinators quit Positive Women, however, in 2004, Jane Bruning became the full-time employed national coordinator after a Special general meeting that voted to have an employed coordinator.

In 2017, Jane Bruning was awarded the New Zealand Order of Merit for her contributions to the support and care of women living with HIV in New Zealand.

== Events ==
=== Women's retreat ===
In 1998, Positive women began their women's retreat, which gives women who live with HIV to come together and build community, as well as receive education on the current climate of HIV. The retreat has been shown to have a positive effect on the women living with HIV who attend.

=== National HIV Treatment Seminar ===
Positive Women Inc. host an annual seminar focusing on women living with HIV In New Zealand. This generally happens the same week as the annual Women's Retreat. Every year, the seminar features educational sessions and inspiring speakers from the healthcare community, researchers, and people living with HIV. The focus of the seminar is education, especially for health professionals, counsellors, social workers, and anyone else with an interest in the HIV sector, as well as people living with HIV.

=== Auckland’s Puawai Festival ===
In 2015, the first Auckland’s Puawai Festival was held over a six day period to empower people living with HIV. The festival was a collaboration between Body Positive, Positive Women, Borni Te Rongopai Tukiwaho and in the later events with the New Zealand Aids Foundation (now known as Burnett Foundation). The event came about when Body Positive approached Borni Te Rongopai Tukiwaho through performance and art. The festival was held annual, generally near World AIDS Day, however, the festival has not happened since the Covid Pandemic.

== Positive Sperm Bank ==
In 2019, Body Positive, New Zealand Aids Foundation and Positive Women launched a sperm bank called Sperm Positive for HIV-positive people to donate. This is the first of its kind in the world, and received significant media attention across the world. On January 27, 2021, Amy became the first ever baby to be born from a HIV sperm bank. As part of the Campaign, a picture book was released called The Baby who Changed the World. The campaign won a multiple awards at the Cannes Festival of Creativity.

== Other Campaigns ==
In 2009, Positive Women released a campaign revealing the faces of four women who are living with HIV. Over two months the women's profiles were appearing on buses, in women’s magazines, and websites as part of a destigmatisation campaign. This campaign has expanded with Positive Women urging women to get tested for HIV as not enough women in New Zealand get tested.

== Services ==
=== Positive speakers bureau ===
One of the service that Positive Women coordinate is the Positive speakers bureau. This service supplies businesses, health organisations, and schools with HIV-related education. This is done by members of the HIV-positive community telling their story in order to raise awareness and reduce HIV stigma and discrimination.

=== Te Taenga Mai ===
Te Taenga Mai is an umbrella brand under Positive Women which aims to provide HIV prevention and support in Aotearoa for migrants, refugees and asylum seekers. Part of this service is providing free condoms to the community. Over 10,000 male condoms and 1,100 female condoms were given out in the first half of 2024.

== Bibliography ==
Picture book

- The Baby Who Changed the World (art by Tim Wilde, Body Positive, Positive Women, 2021)

== See also ==
- Burnett Foundation Aotearoa
- Body Positive
- List of Peer-led HIV testing organisations in New Zealand
