= New Zealand AIDS Memorial Quilt =

Quilt panel by Welby Ings, for Ian Williams

Quilt panel made by Welby Ings for Kevin Todd

The New Zealand AIDS Memorial Quilt is part of the worldwide community movement to memorialise people who have died of AIDS or HIV-related illnesses.

The Quilt concept originated in San Francisco in 1987 and is now known as the NAMES Project AIDS Memorial Quilt. The intention of the Quilt concept was to "intention was to raise awareness and enable loved ones to express feelings of love, loss and regret in a permanent and tangible way." The New Zealand Quilt Project dates to 1988.

The first New Zealand panel to be made memorialises Peter Cuthbert. On October 5, 1991, the Quilt was officially unveiled, in the presence of Governor General Dame Catherine Tizard.

The Quilt consists of 16 blocks in total, most made up of eight panels measuring 3 by 6 feet stitched together.

In 2010 the Quilt was digitised and made available online through the New Zealand AIDS Memorial Quilt website.

In 2012 a significant portion of the Quilt was gifted to the Museum of New Zealand Te Papa Tongarewa for caretaking. A small portion of the Quilt was retained in Auckland by the New Zealand AIDS Foundation to be used in talks and events.

== See also ==
- Australian AIDS Memorial Quilt
- NAMES Project AIDS Memorial Quilt (United States)

== Further information ==
- New Zealand AIDS Memorial Quilt website
- Audio recordings related to the New Zealand AIDS Memorial Quilt
- The beginnings of the AIDS Memorial Quilt Project in New Zealand and Australia oral history project
- Gifting of the Quilt to Te Papa
