= Burnett Foundation Aotearoa =

New Zealand national HIV prevention and healthcare organization

Burnett Foundation Aotearoa (formerly the New Zealand AIDS Foundation (NZAF)) is New Zealand's national HIV prevention organisation. Its funding is derived from grants, donations and the Ministry of Health.

Burnett Foundation Aotearoa has a vision of 'an Aotearoa with zero new HIV transmissions, where people living with HIV thrive, and rainbow and takatāpui communities enjoy great mental and sexual health' and aims to achieve this by preventing the transmission of HIV and supporting people affected by HIV and AIDS.

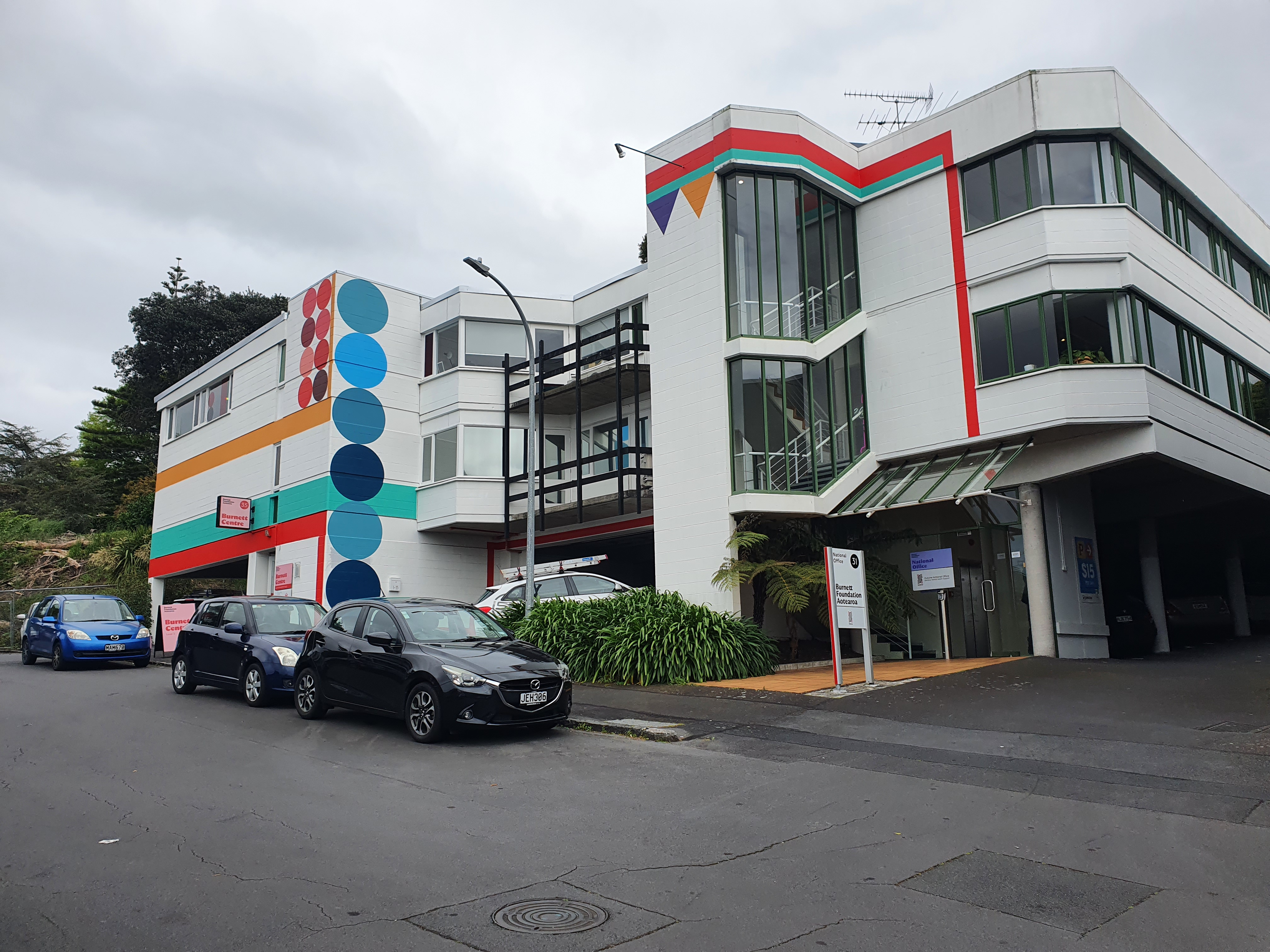
The Burnett Foundation Aotearoa national office in Auckland

== History ==
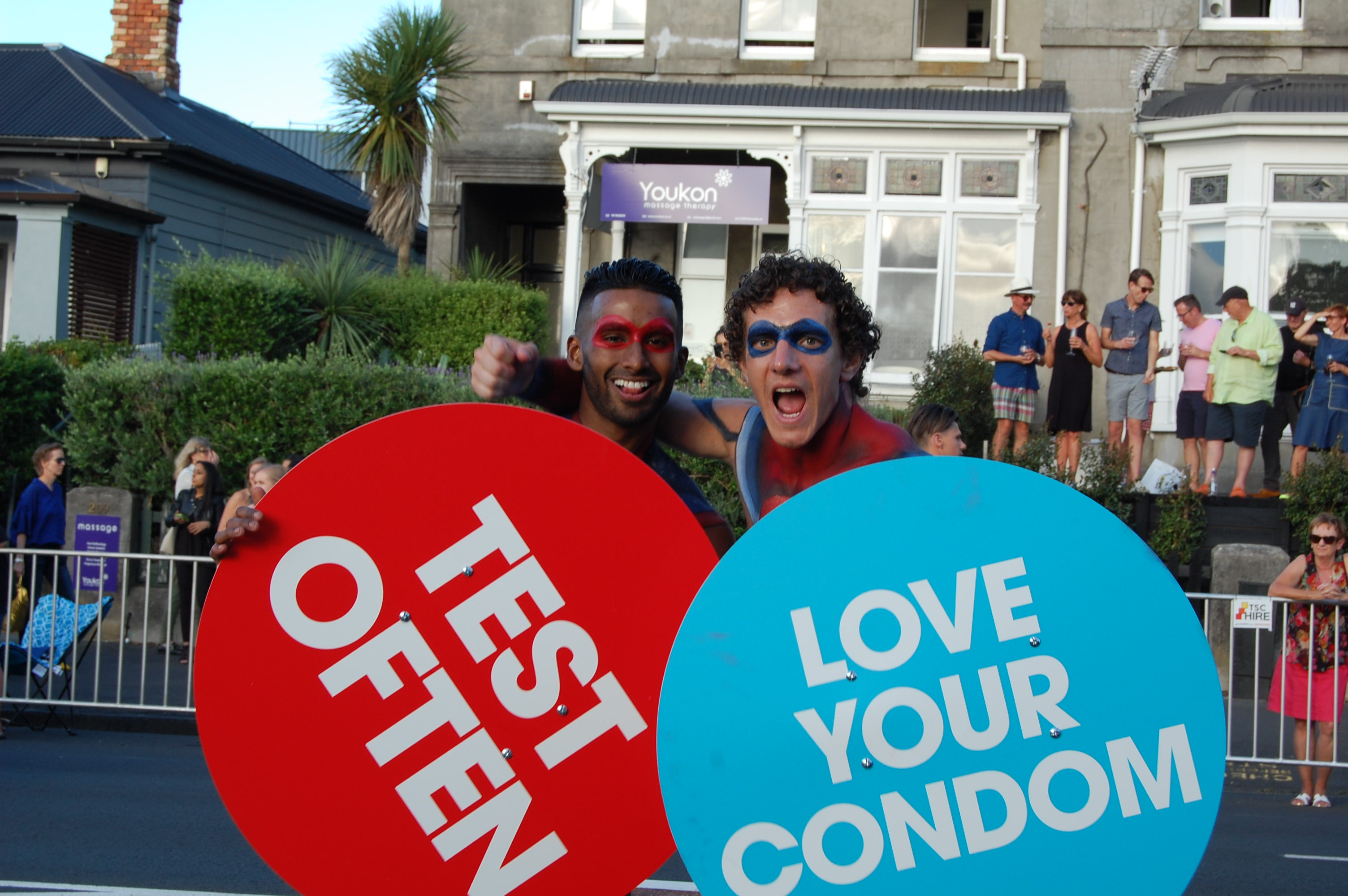
NZ AIDS Foundation 'Love your condom' campaign on Auckland pride parade in 2016

Founded in 1985, the New Zealand AIDS Foundation has grown from the response of New Zealand's gay communities to the impending HIV epidemic. It grew from the national AIDS Support Network established in 1984 by Bruce Burnett, Bill Logan and Phil Parkinson.

From its earliest days as a grassroots movement, the NZAF has provided a New Zealand response to HIV, bringing history, passion, knowledge, and diversity to fight the emerging trends of the HIV epidemic.

During 2009, the NZAF introduced the NZAF HIV Prevention Plan 2009-2014; a significant review and redesign of the population health programme. The plan includes a clear focus on building a condom culture in New Zealand. Get it On! is the new social marketing programme developed and supported by the NZAF, which is committed to doing that. An important part of this programme is the largest gay community event in New Zealand, the Big Gay Out.

In June 2022, the NZAF rebranded to Burnett Foundation Aotearoa, in part to honour Bruce Burnett, one of the first people living with AIDS in New Zealand, but also to reflect the evolving work that the organisation does.

== Programmes ==
Burnett Foundation Aotearoa provides health and support services to people with HIV to maximise their health and their ability to maintain safe sexual practice and HIV prevention programmes targeted at the communities most at risk, including HIV and syphilis rapid testing and sexual health clinics. Burnett Foundation Aotearoa historically also undertook research and policy advice.

The national office of Burnett Foundation Aotearoa is in Auckland, and there are regional centres in Christchurch and Wellington. They employ more than 30 staff and have well over 100 regular volunteers. There are also trained professional contractors providing HIV and syphilis rapid testing and counselling in many other regions across New Zealand. Outside of New Zealand, Burnett Foundation Aotearoa manages an international development programme working with partners in the Pacific committed to the rights and health of Pacific men who have sex with men and transgender people.

== Health Promotion ==
Burnett Foundation Aotearoa Get it on! uses the Big Gay Out festival as an avenue to promote safe sex and develop condom culture in New Zealand. A survey administered during the 2012 Big Gay Out festival determined that those who stayed longer were more knowledgeable and positive toward condom culture and felt that the Get it on! message was an empowering one. Survey participants also said the program "helped to educate men about safe sex" and "helped them feel good about having safe sex." In 2014, Get It On! was dropped and LYC was adopted as the main message. Love Your Condom (LYC) is New Zealand Aids Foundation's social marketing programme for gay and bisexual men. It addresses a complex mix of attitudinal, behavioural and social change amongst a community that can be difficult to define and reach. The LYC Social Marketing team talks about the programme's history, the challenges they face and what keeps them loving what they do. In 2017, New Zealand Aids Foundation dropped Love Your Condom and created a new campaign called Ending HIV. It has a goal of ending new HIV transmission in New Zealand by 2025. The campaign highlight key points including:

- Playing safe. Which means safe sex with the use of condoms and taking PrEP.
- Testing Often. Most HIV transmissions happen with people who don't know they have HIV and have unprotected sex. Testing often will diagnose people with HIV and get them onto treatment which will help stop spreading HIV.
- Treat Early. Treating early not only protects personal health, but it also reduces the chance of transmitting HIV to another person.
- Ending HIV Stigma. Stigma refers to prejudice and discrimination towards people living with HIV, their friends, partners and whānau. Even though HIV stigma was at its peak during the early days of the AIDS epidemic, many people living with HIV still experience prejudice on a daily basis.

== Collaborations ==
=== Positive Women Inc ===
Positive Women Inc is a separate organisation that isn't part of Burnett Foundation Aotearoa, however, Positive Women is located in the Burnett Foundation building in Auckland.

=== Positive Sperm Bank ===
In 2019, Body Positive, Burnett Foundation Aotearoa and Positive Women Inc launched a sperm bank called Sperm Positive for HIV-positive people to donate. This is the first of its kind in the world, which received significant media attention across the world. On January 27, 2021, Amy was born who became the first ever baby to be born from a HIV sperm bank. As part of the Campaign, a picture book was released called The Baby who Changed the world. The campaign won a multiple awards at the Cannes Festival of Creativity.

=== Auckland's Puawai Festival ===
In 2015, the first Auckland's Puawai Festival was held over a six day period to empower people living with HIV. The festival was a collaboration between Body Positive, Positive Women Inc, Borni Te Rongopai Tukiwaho and in the later events with the Burnett Foundation Aotearoa. The event came about when Body Positive approached Borni Te Rongopai Tukiwaho through performance and art. The festival was held annual, generally near World AIDS Day, however, the festival has not happened since the Covid Pandemic.

== See also ==
- Body Positive
- Positive Women Inc
- List of Peer-led HIV testing organisations in New Zealand
