= Hinematau McNeill =

New Zealand Māori academic

- Born: Hinematau Naomi McNeill
- Education: University of Auckland, Auckland University of Technology
- Scientific career
- Fields: Māori language revival
- Workplaces: Waiariki Community College, Auckland University of Technology
- Thesis: Te hau ora o naga kaumatua o Tuhoe: a study of Tuhoe kaumatua mental wellness (2007)

Hinematau Naomi McNeill (also writing under Naomi Te Hiini) is a New Zealand academic and treaty negotiator. She is of Tapuika Māori descent. As of 2019, she is a full professor at the Auckland University of Technology.

== Early life and education ==
McNeill was born in Rotorua. She studied her B.A. and M.A. in social anthropology at Auckland University and Waikato University. She is currently principal lecturer in Māori Studies at Auckland Institute of Technology.

== Career ==
After graduating, McNeill returned to Rotorua, teaching at Waiariki Community College including development of their Māori Studies B.A. course. She additionally advocated for mandatory domestic violence reporting and the founding of Māori women's refuges during the 1980s.

In 1997, she joined the Te Ara Poutama department of Māori and indigenous development at Auckland University of Technology. Whist there, she also completed a PhD in 2007 titled 'Te hau ora o naga kaumatua o Tuhoe: a study of Tuhoe kaumatua mental wellness', rising to full professor in 2019.

During this time, she also acted as a treaty negotiator for her iwi, settling with the crown in 2014. She is also an advocate for the Māori language, co-creating a teaching app in 2020.

== Selected works ==
- McNeill, Hinematau Naomi. "Māori and the natural environment from an occupational justice perspective." Journal of Occupational Science 24, no. 1 (2017): 19–28.
- McNeill, Hinematau. "Attitudes to family violence: Maori study." Attitudes to Family Violence–A Study Across Cultures (1986).
- McNeill, Hinematau. "A critical reflection of ethical issues in research." (2008).
- McNeill, H. N. "Maori models of mental wellness." (2009).
- Attitudes to Family Violence: A Study Across Cultures. Prepared by Synergy Research Limited & Hinematau McNeill, Jane von Dadelszen, Alison Gray, Emele Duituturaga & Raewyn Good, Rosemary Ash. Wellington, N.Z.: Family Violence Prevention Co-ordinating Committee c/- Department of Social Welfare, 1988.
