= Art of the AIDS Crisis =

Artistic portrayals of HIV/AIDS

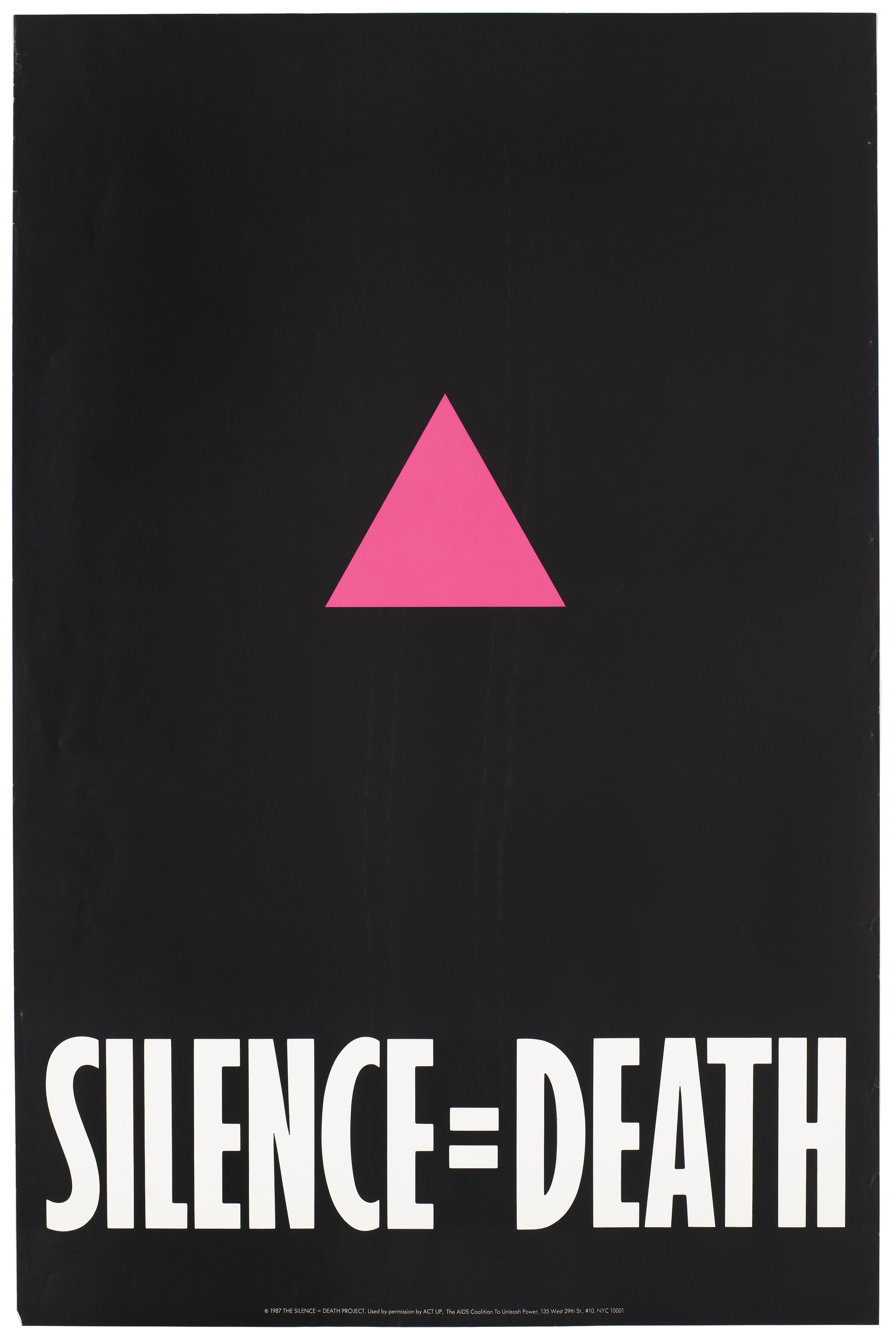
Gran Fury advertisement Silence=Death.

The AIDS pandemic began in the early 1980s and brought with it a surge of emotions from the public: they were afraid, angry, fearful and defiant. The arrival of AIDS also brought with it a condemnation of the LGBT community. These emotions, along with the view on the LGBT community, paved the way for a new generation of artists. Artists involved in AIDS activist organizations had the ideology that while art could never save lives as science could, it may be able to deliver a message. Art of the AIDS crisis typically sought to make a sociopolitical statement, stress the medical impact of the disease, or express feelings of longing and loss. The ideologies were present in conceptions of art in the 1980s and are still pertinent to reception of art today as well. Elizabeth Taylor, for example, spoke at a benefit for AIDS involving artwork, emphasizing its importance to activism in that "art lives on forever". This comment articulates the ability of artwork from this time to teach and impact contemporary audiences, post-crisis. This page examines the efforts of artists, art collectives, and art movements to make sense of such an urgent pandemic in American society.

== Public and collective artistic AIDS activism ==
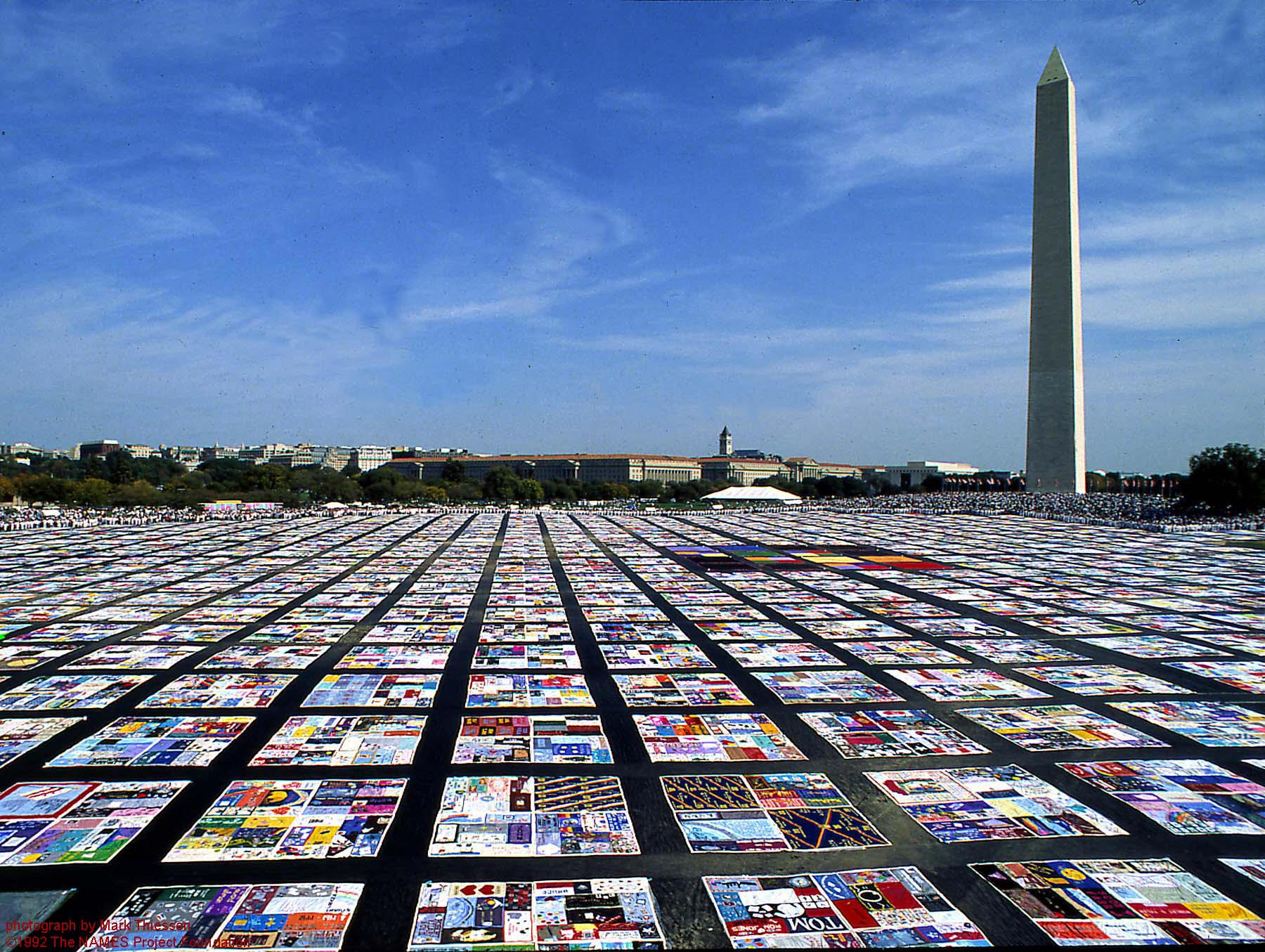
NAMES Project AIDS Memorial Quilt in Washington, D.C.

Individual artistry of the AIDS crisis often was often found in museums or art galleries, in the spaces that only the economically and socially privileged could benefit from their messages. Artistic and Activist Collectives were meant to reach the general public, providing a space to build community, mourn, and spread education about the AIDS epidemic in a much more prolific manner.

One example would be the NAMES Project AIDS Memorial Quilt, a large quilt begun in 1987 containing thousands of panels that commemorate those living with or those who have died of AIDS. The quilt is composed of panels of many colors and patterns, some somber and dark, others vibrant, and it tells no narrative other than remembrance. Each panel commemorates an individual or group who suffered from AIDS, although some individuals have several panels dedicated to them and others have simply a first name, a familial or relationship-related nickname, or "anonymous." In June 2006, the quilt commemorated approximately 83,900 names, although the NAMES Project pointed out that the thousands of names represented less than a quarter of all U.S. AIDS deaths, and an even smaller percentage for the total number of AIDS-related deaths worldwide.

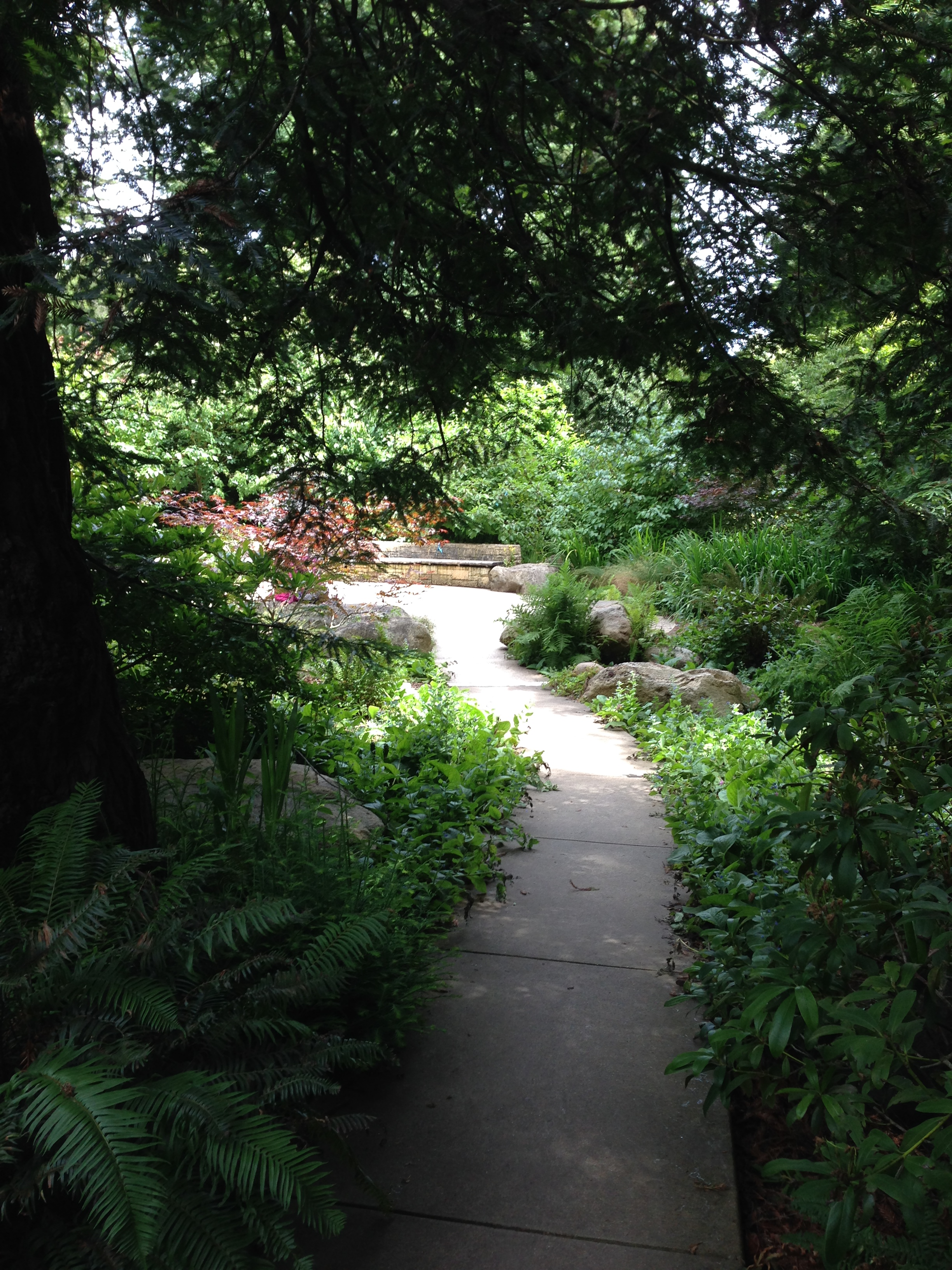
National AIDS Memorial Grove

The National AIDS Memorial Grove, which can be found in San Francisco's Golden Gate Park, was first conceived by a group of local individuals in 1988. The AIDS epidemic had been devastating to San Francisco, and the group desired a tranquil environment in which to mourn healthily. Work began at the site of the de Lavveaga Dell in 1991, and in 1996, Nancy Pelosi led the United States Congress in passing the National AIDS Memorial Grove Act of 1996, which was signed into law by President Bill Clinton. The site has been cared for by hundreds of volunteers and a city gardener. The Grove houses a flat concrete circle on the ground, intended to be engraved with the names of those who suffer from AIDS. This act of memorializing is participatory and open for visitors to take part in. In 2011, Andy Abrahams Wilson and Tom Shepard created a documentary about the process of creating the Grove, discussing the contest for a potential design and the mixed responses the Board of Directors felt to them. Other responses to the Grove have been less positive, including tagging, graffiti, and vandalizing.

Gran Fury, begun in 1988, the artistic committee within ACT UP, was an anonymous collective designed to create artistic media about the AIDS epidemic. The collective functioned as an anonymous group because it took emphasis away from any individual and reinforced the idea of collective efforts towards ending the crisis. Gran Fury's mission was to bring a close to the epidemic, primarily through bringing to light the issues that society grappled with, such as homophobia and discrimination of people with AIDS (PWA). The collective brought art into the public sphere often to reach wider audiences than it could reach within the museum space; additionally, because the group often faced censorship, it took to illegally posting work on the city streets.

DIVA TV (Damned Interfering Video Activist Television), begun in 1989, was a collective of artists who utilized video as their primary mediums, targeting their work at ACT UP members. Founded by Catherine Saalfield (now Catherine Gund), Ray Navarro, Jean Carlomusto, Gregg Bordowitz, Bob Beck, Costa Papas, Ellen Spiro, George Plaggianos, and Rob Kurilla, DIVA TV created videos that covered ACT UP actions as well as events within the movement. DIVA TV functioned as an educational queer television program that often educated its viewers about the AIDS epidemic. Some characteristic features of DIVA TV were its staunchly unprofessional style, with unrefined shots and no studio cleaning up of the footage, and tendency towards civil disobedience.

The artists who formed the Visual AIDS Artists Caucus created the AIDS awareness ribbon in 1991. They wished to create a visual symbol to demonstrate compassion for people living with AIDS and their caregivers. Inspired by the yellow ribbons honoring American soldiers serving in the Gulf war, the color red was chosen for its, "connection to blood and the idea of passion—not only anger, but love, like a valentine." First worn onscreen by a celebrity by Jeremy Irons at the 1991 Tony Awards, the red ribbon soon became renowned as an international symbol of AIDS awareness. At the Freddie Mercury Tribute Concert held at Wembley Stadium, London on Easter Sunday 1992, more than 100,000 red ribbons were distributed among the audience by Red Ribbon International, with performers such as George Michael wearing one. The Red Ribbon continues to be a powerful force in the fight to increase public awareness of HIV/AIDS and in the lobbying efforts to increase funding for AIDS services and research.

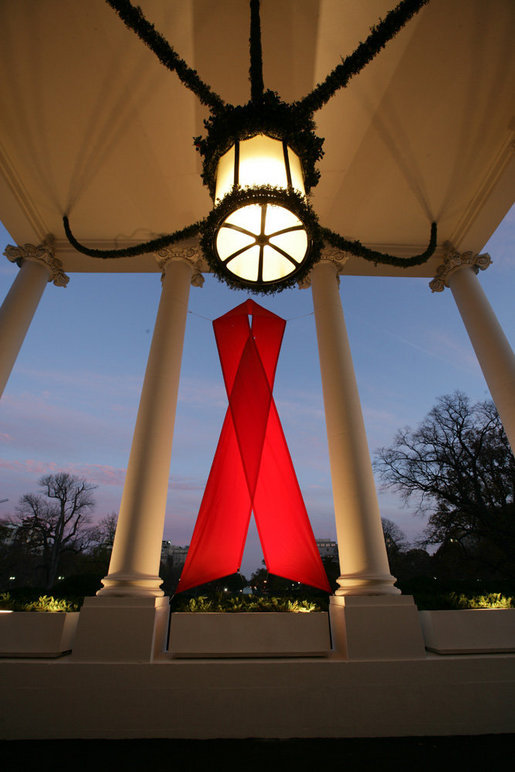
A large red ribbon hangs between columns in the north portico of the White House for World AIDS Day, November 30, 2007.

To symbolize the United States' commitment to combat the world AIDS epidemic through its landmark PEPFAR program, Steven M. Levine, a communications aid in President George W. Bush's administration, proposed that the administration display a 28 foot (8.5 m) AIDS ribbon on the White House's iconic North Portico on World AIDS Day 2007. The display, now an annual tradition across four administrations, quickly garnered attention, as it was the first banner, sign or symbol to prominently hang from the White House since Abraham Lincoln lived in the building.

Proyecto ContraSIDA por Vida, a Latino/a HIV prevention agency that began in San Francisco in 1993, was designed to reach a marginalized populations in San Francisco impacted by the AIDS pandemic: specifically, queer Latin@ youth, sex workers, and transgender populations and other disenfranchise people in San Francisco's Mission district. Proyecto used very progressive language and radical interpellation (giving identity to something) in its advertisements, which facilitated the inclusion of a wider audience. Additionally, Proyecto used a mixture of Spanish and English in its brochures and posters, which represented the mixed identities of its audiences while also making clear that the Spanish-speaking audience was the crucial demographic in Proyecto's mission. The agency offered several workshops aimed at a vast array of different identities in order to facilitate discourse and build communal relations while also educating the young population about sexual practices and the issues of the AIDS epidemic. Proyecto often used very poignant artistic activism in symbolic and provocative ways, such as a papaya shown in erotic ways to suggest Latino/a sexuality. Proyecto also facilitated workshops in which participants created images in response to the AIDS pandemic; these images were based on retablos, a Latino traditional art form.

== Individual artists ==
Nicholas Nixon became well known as a photographer; in 1988 he had an exhibition at the Museum of Modern Art in New York City entitled "Pictures of People." Some photographs were of people with AIDS, documenting their physical deterioration in intervals of weeks or months. Nixon claimed that his goal was to visually capture the dire consequences of the AIDS epidemic. His depiction of people with AIDS was very controversial as some claimed his images were of hopeless, lonely individuals. During the exhibition at the MOMA, an offset of ACT UP called the AIDS Coalition to Unleash Power staged a very calm protest against Nixon's images of PWA.

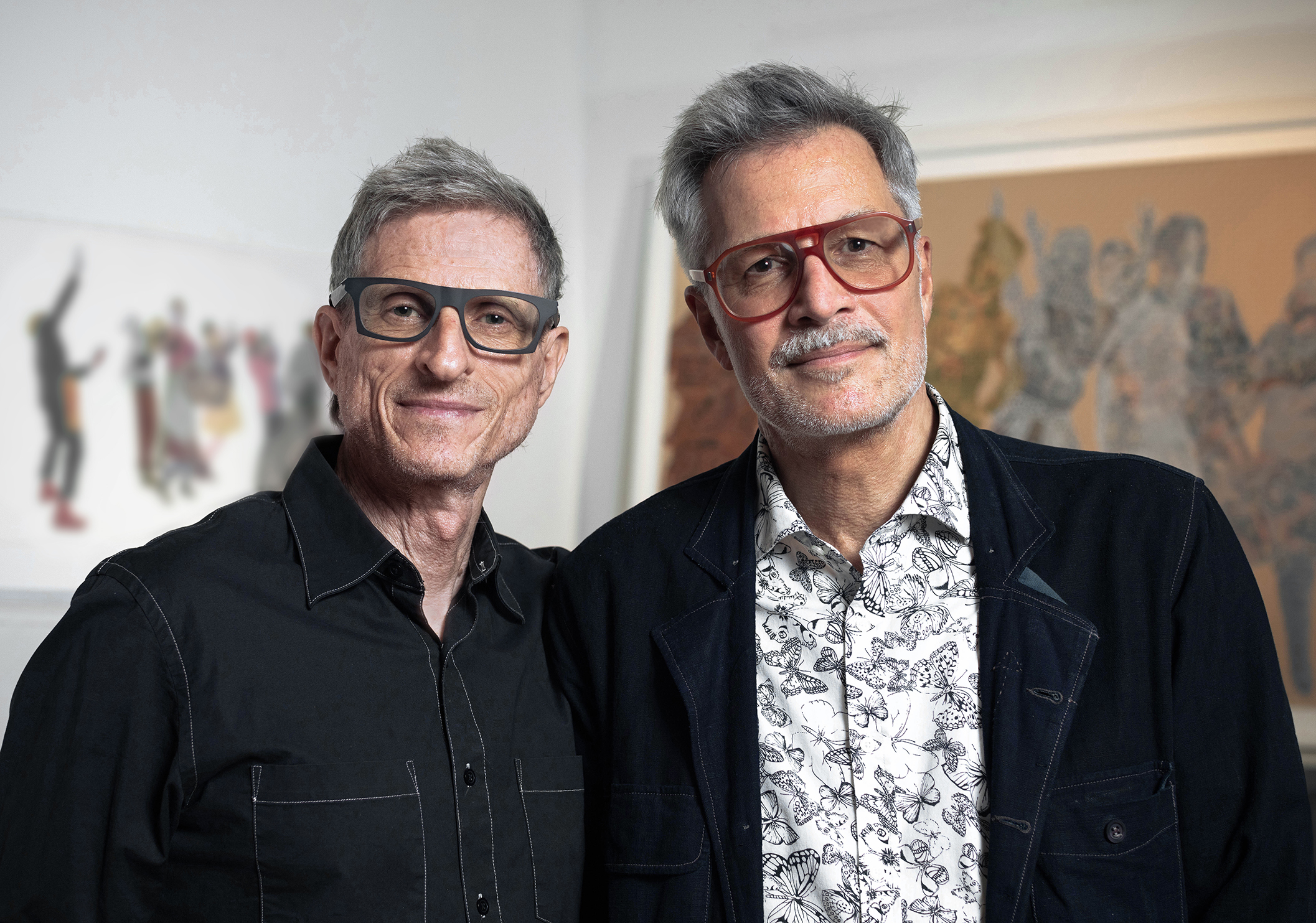
Aziz + Cucher in their Brooklyn studio, 2022

Aziz + Cucher, a collaborative duo who have created much art aside from the AIDS epidemic, created the Chimera series after Cucher was diagnosed with HIV. Cucher was very ill after his diagnosis until medicinal advancements allowed him to restore his health and survive the virus. The series captures the mixture of medical and technological advancements that restored Cucher's standard of health and attempts to signal the life experience and comfort that Cucher finds in biotechnology as a person living with HIV.

Sunil Gupta is an artist who was diagnosed with HIV but was able to live healthily due to medicinal advancements. Gupta created a series titled From Here to Eternity in 2001 in which he photographs his daily life and routines as a person living with HIV, including getting blood drawn. Unlike prior photographs of people diagnosed with HIV, Gupta's images are less morbid and insist on his own vitality. Gupta's work is often categorized as a visual depiction of an ongoing experience of AIDS.

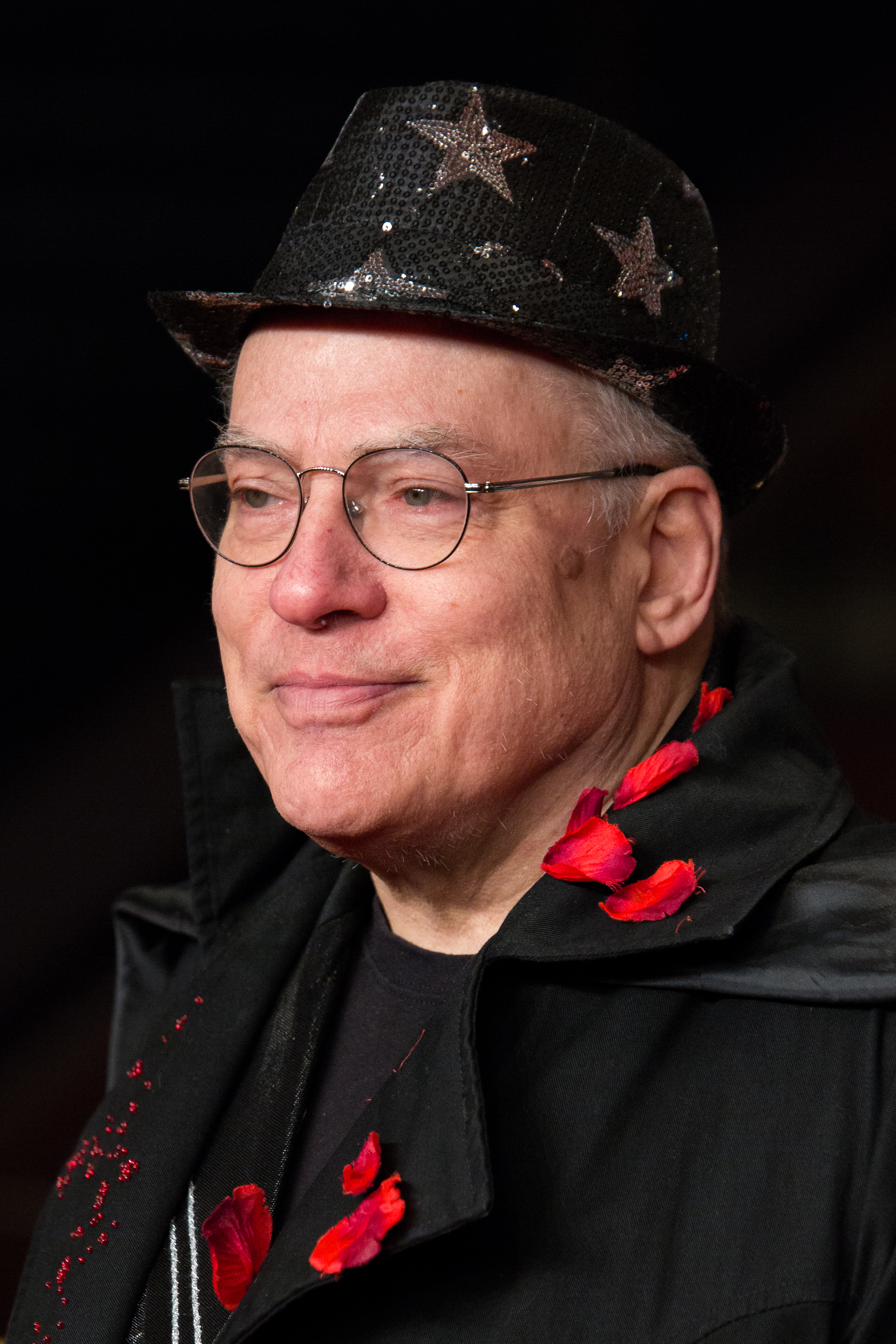
Rosa von Praunheim in 2018 at the Berlinale

The famous avant-garde director Rosa von Praunheim campaigned for AIDS education, safe sex and the rights of the infected with his art right from the start of the HIV epidemic. In the USA he was able to get a lot of attention with his films Silence = Death and Positive (1990), which deal particularly with the fight of American artists such as Keith Haring and David Wojnarowicz against AIDS. He was a co-founder of ACT UP in Germany and carried out numerous high-profile campaigns in his home country to draw attention to the situation of infected people. The director's radical approach made him an international icon of AIDS activism.

David Wojnarowicz was an American artist and AIDS activist who also suffered from and died of AIDS. The artist was particularly provoked by the silence of the Reagan and Bush administrations in regards to the AIDS crisis, which he saw as a result of the straight white men being the ones in charge of what the public is exposed to via the media. His work was typically political in nature, but was also autobiographical in that he drew from his own experiences as a queer person with AIDS. His work often borrowed imagery from Pop Art, street art, science, and the Surrealist movement, but he developed his own arsenal of iconic images that included soldiers, men embracing each other, and animals, among other things. In 1987, Wojnarowicz lost his friend Peter Hujar and in the same year was diagnosed with AIDS. After these events, Wojnarowicz increasingly turned to photography as his medium of choice, incorporating text in a signature way.

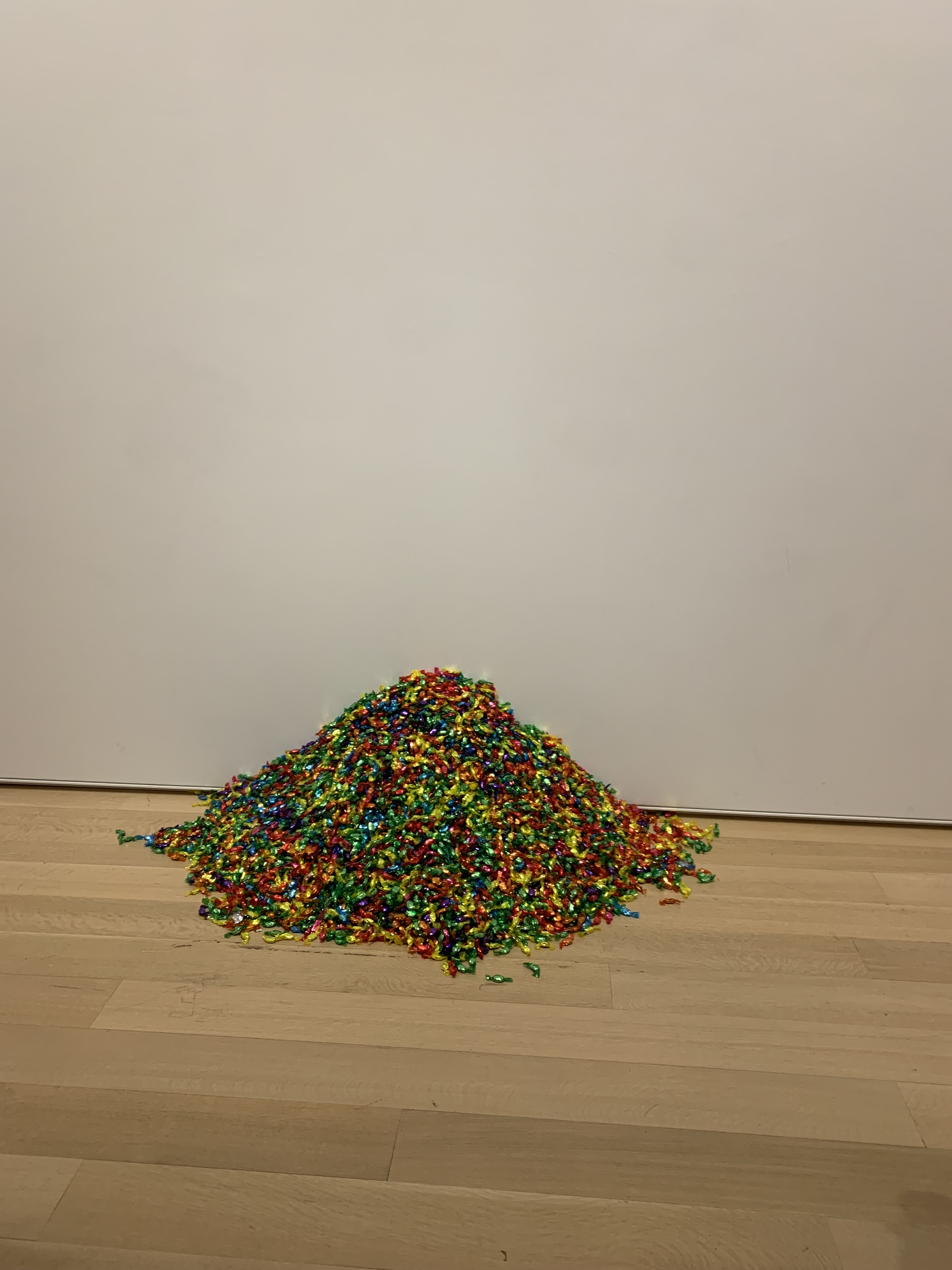
"Untitled" (Portrait of Ross in L.A.) by Félix González-Torres, in the Art Institute of Chicago

Félix González-Torres has become a famous queer artist in contemporary America, and he created many works in relation to AIDS, specifically how HIV/AIDS affected his romantic life. The emotional toll of losing a lover to disease was emphasized, allowing audiences to examine a Queer relationship through a loving, domestic lens, distant from any presumed homoeroticism that masses expected to find with AIDS-related art. His work was rarely, if ever, explicitly queer or open about its sociologically political commentary in regards to American culture and AIDS. Instead, Gonzalez-Torres made several post-minimalist pieces that were regarded as timeless, and photographs that any individual could relate to without ever knowing its queer undertones "Untitled" (Portrait of Ross in L.A.). Many of Gonzalez-Torres' pieces were conceptual and participatory, and often viewers were encouraged to take a piece of the artwork home with them. Josh Takano Chambers-Letson stated that Gonzalez-Torres' work infected the spectator with an "ideological virus," which the spectator would carry with them to reflect on later. Gonzalez-Torres desired to bring the discussion about queer identity and the AIDS epidemic away from the legislative halls of the country and into the more public space of the art gallery. He was well aware of the censorship of queer culture going on within the nation, and he stated that he intentionally created queer work that would be indecipherable to any conservative seeking to debase his work; if they indeed could understand the queer and homoerotic tones of his conceptual pieces, the conservative would have to explain the way in which he or she came to understand these things.

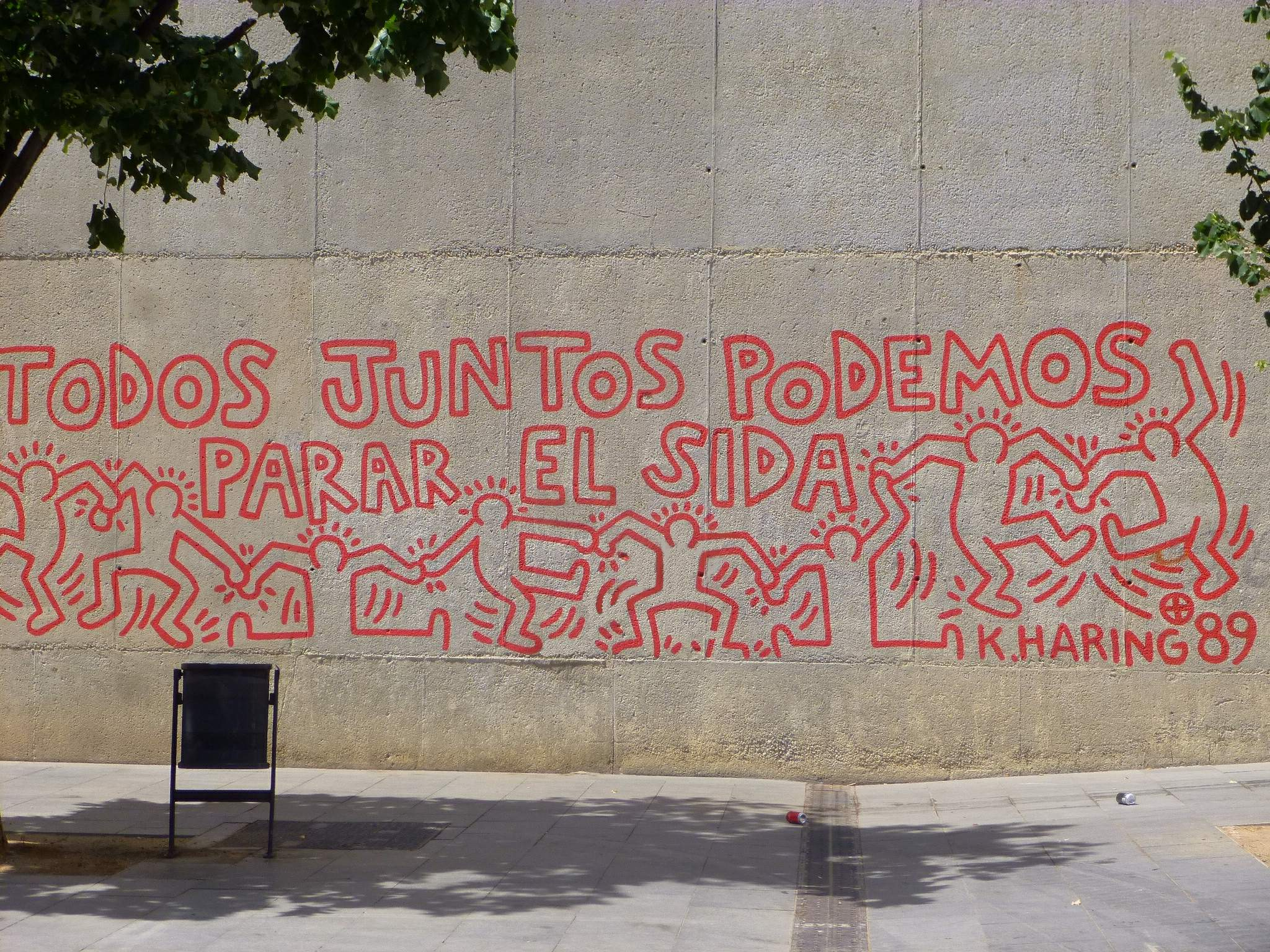
Todos juntos podemos parar el sida in Barcelona, by Keith Haring

Keith Haring, diagnosed with AIDS in 1988, had been an artist since childhood. Haring first studied art at the Ivy School of Professional Art in Pittsburgh and eventually at the School of Visual Arts. It was at this second school, located in New York, that he became part of a thriving artist community. Haring knew he wanted to create public art based on his inspiration from artists such as Jean Dubuffet, Pierre Alechinsky, William S. Burroughs, Brion Gysin, and Robert Henri. He began his career doing “subway art” but quickly became recognized for his exhibits in New York and a Pop Shop selling a multitude of items of different media. Haring was a well-known public artist with many pieces in Children’s hospitals before his AIDS diagnosis. AIDS further prompted him to make public art that specifically showed imagery of the AIDS epidemic, including Todos Juntos Podemos Parar el SIDA; this was the start of the Keith Haring Foundation. Haring's last major collaboration The Valley with William S. Burroughs is an ominous allegorical depiction of the horror and chaos of the AIDS Crisis, published weeks before his death. By the time of Haring’s death in 1990, he had already been featured in multiple newspapers and magazines with artwork in both solo and group exhibitions.

Robert Mapplethorpe, born in 1946, fell in love with art and photography at a young age. He began experimenting with Polaroids, which led to his first exhibit and continued with photography after acquiring a camera. Mapplethorpe shot photographs that many at the time found “shocking”. These photographs included work of the New York BDSM scene and nudes of males and females. In the year 1986, when he was diagnosed with AIDS, Mapplethorpe had a number of commissions, including but not limited to, designing dance performance sets and taking portraits of New York artists for the book, 50 New York Artists. Before Mapplethorpe died in 1989 he managed to not only make a huge impact on modern art but also establish the Robert Mapplethorpe Foundation which promotes and supports continuation of the arts as well as help fund medical research for AIDS.

=== AIDS Video Movement ===
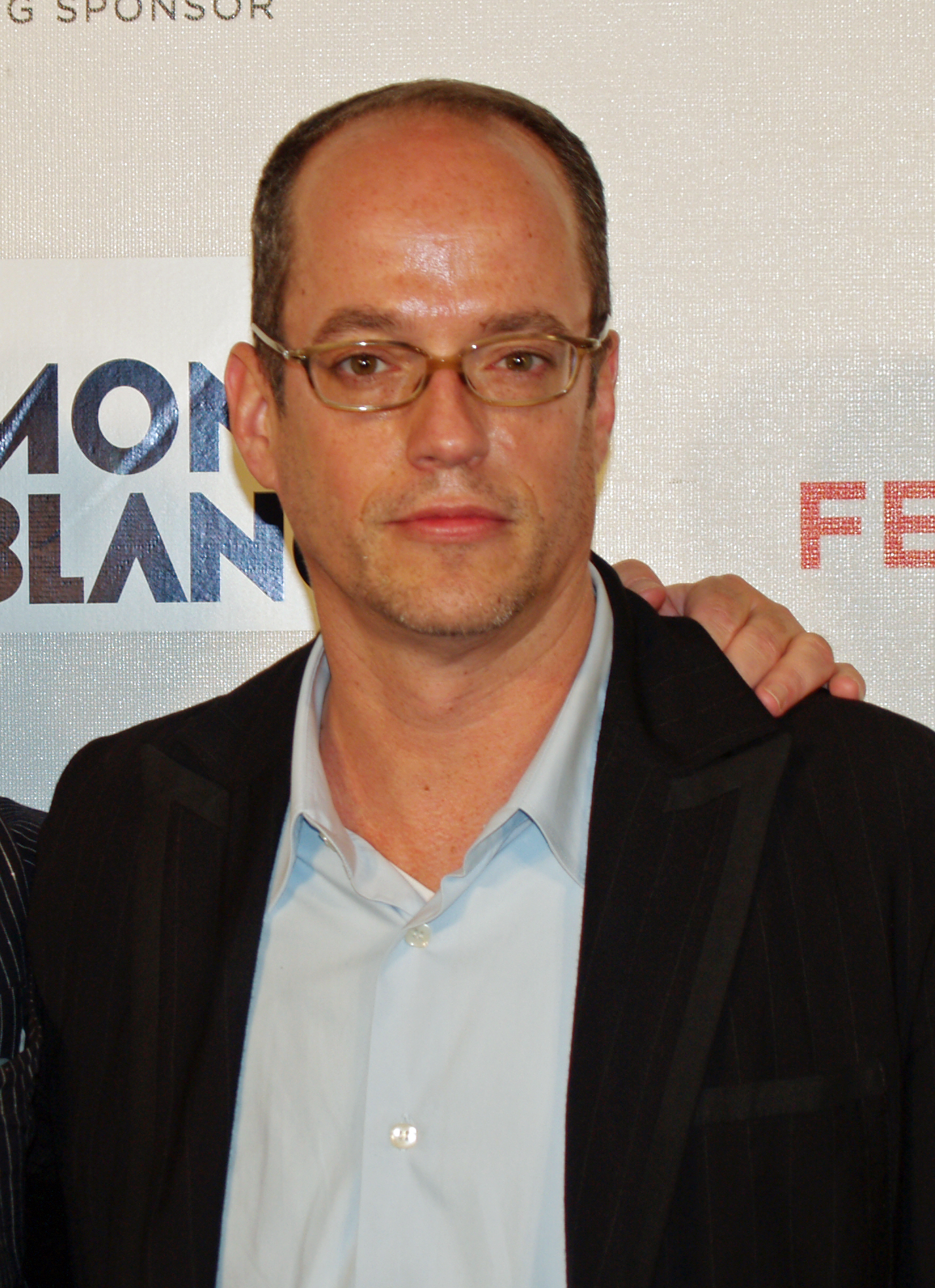
Tom Kalin at the 2008 Tribeca Film Festival

The AIDS Video Movement consisted of several different video and filmmakers. Tom Kalin was an American AIDS activist and director who made at least eight videos directly focusing on the AIDS epidemic, yet he has stated that all of his works are somewhat affected by the AIDS crisis. Kalin's works express his own personal responses to the epidemic and his search for his community during the crisis. He made his videos specifically for those who were victims of the crisis, many of whom were friends of his. Juanita Mohammed was a female AIDS activist and filmmaker whose earliest work began when she was producing with WAVE, the Women's AIDS Video Enterprise. With WAVE, Mohammed worked to empower marginalized women who were disproportionately affected by AIDS in their communities, specifically lower income women of color. Mohammed later took charge of the production of Words to Live By, a video created by teenagers, for teenagers; Mohammed was especially fond of this work for the authenticity of the voice of its filmmakers towards its audience, and for its educational potential for a demographic that was not properly educated enough about AIDS. Ray Navarro, mentioned earlier as a founding member of DIVA-TV, was a Chicano video artist and writer who created work that reflected what Joshua Javier Guzman calls a "queer Chicano aesthetic." Ray Navarro's work expresses his ambivalence towards life in the AIDS epidemic and that of the queer Chicano community, using the stylistic structure of the camera frame as a mode of depicting the separation between the inner, private life and external socialization, which is embodied in the ambivalence of the queer Chicano aesthetic.

== Music ==
The AIDS Quilt Songbook initially was an 18-song collection that premiered in 1992 but now is an ongoing song-cycle by multiple composers, now with sub-collections centered in Chicago, Minnesota, Chapel Hill, Philadelphia and Tacoma.

Widely regarded as the first symphony to deal with the subject, John Corigliano's Symphony No. 1 (written between 1988 and 1989 and first performed in 1990), was partly inspired by the NAMES Project AIDS Memorial Quilt and its three movements are dedicated to a pianist, a music executive, and a cellist respectively, all friends and colleagues in Corigliano’s life that he memorializes.

The longest string quartet ever written in Australia, the AIDS Memoir Quartet is a 17-movement work by Lyle Chan, a member of ACT UP during the 1990s. The work is 90 minutes long when performed without narration, and 2 hours with. It contains portraits of famous activist friends now dead, and unusual effects like the use of police whistles to recall street demonstrations by ACT UP, the direct action protest group of which Lyle Chan was a core member. He and other activists ran a buyers club to smuggle AIDS treatments from the US that were unavailable in Australia.

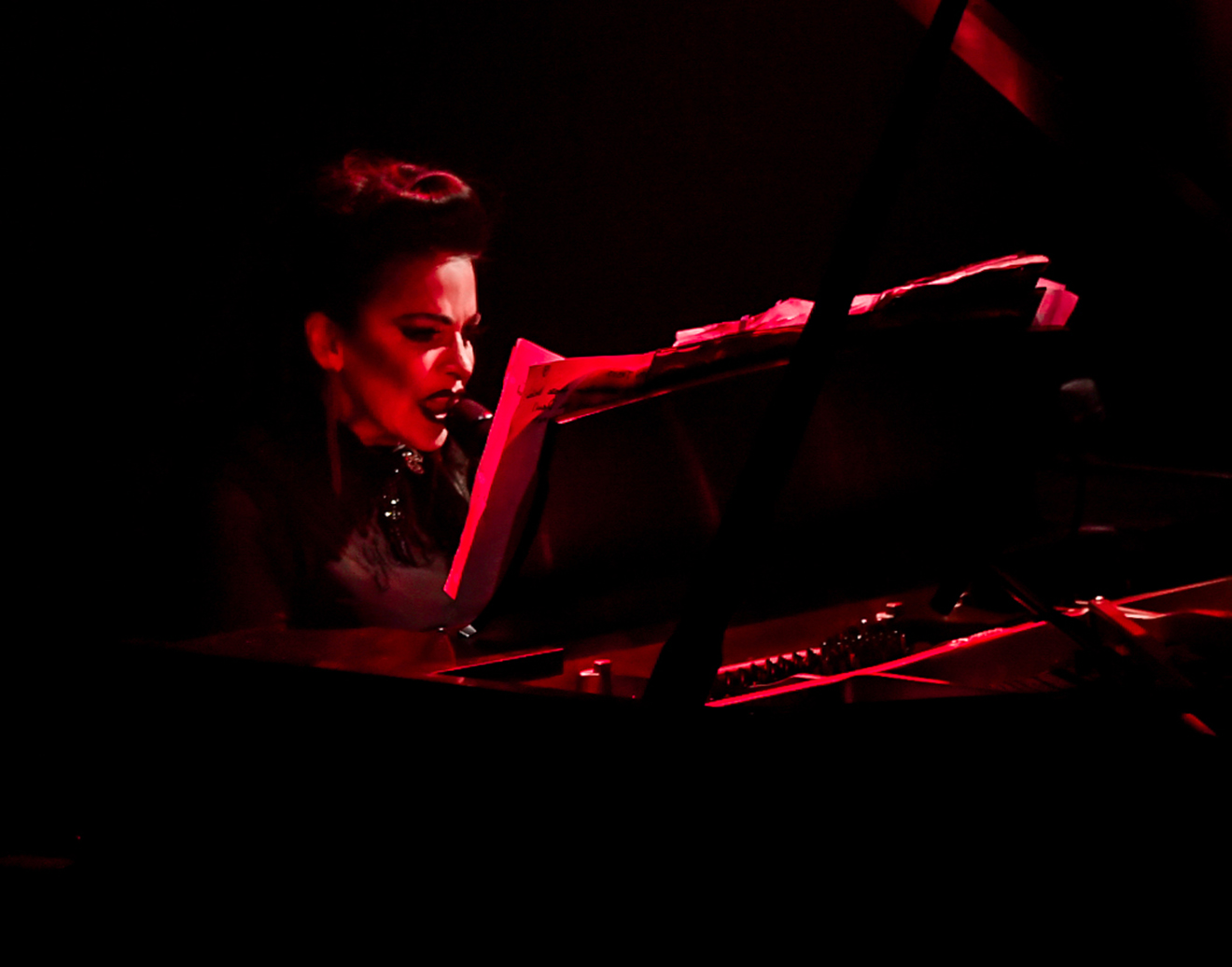
Diamanda Galás at Thalia Hall, Chicago in 2016

In 1985, Elton John, Gladys Knight, Stevie Wonder, and Dionne Warwick recorded a cover of the 1982 song "That's What Friends Are For" and released it as a charity single, with some portion of the proceeds going for AIDS research and prevention. In 1986, the song won a Grammy Award.

Between 1986 and 1988, Diamanda Galás released her trilogy about AIDS called Masque of the Red Death.

== Performance art ==
Ron Athey's performance art often reflects AIDS-related themes, particularly a performance at the Walker Art Center in Minnesota which caused controversy, and his 1993 performance Four Scenes in a Harsh Life.
