= India's Karuna Quilt Movement =

- Location: India
- Type: Social movement

India's Karuna Quilt Movement, started in July 2020 by Taruna Gandotra-Sethi, is an initiative to support the overlooked front line workers by gifting them handmade patchworked quilts. Taruna referred to them as ''Invisible Hands. Karuna translates to gratitude/compassion in Hindi. The movement partners with textile and garment manufacturers who could give them the surplus fabrics that can be upcycled to make quilts to remain sustainable.

== History ==
Taruna, while living in Florida, started quilting as a hobby. In 2016, she had also set up Simply Beautiful Always, an organization that was promoting patchwork quilting. But she realized that patchwork quilting was not just a hobby but also a social movement, such as NAMES Project AIDS Memorial Quilt. She started inviting contributions in form of square blocks of (12.5X12.5 inches) in any form - stitched, painted, crochet, knitted or embroidered. The first goal of the movement was to receive 1500 blocks to create the first 100 quilts in November 2020. By December 2020, the movement had received 1870 blocks. The movement aims to distribute 1000 quilts by 75th Independence Day of India.

Taruna initially started with training her domestic help in quilting and stitching. She eventually started working with not for profit organizations and also hired tailors to stitch the contributed blocks in to quilts of size 54X84 inches. The team of tailors and others included underprivileged people along with hearing and speech impaired individuals, helping them with sustainable employment. Apart from the fabric squares, the movement also received monetary donations to support the initiative. The pilot project was done in Naudega Ballah village in Dharbhanga district when one of her staff members was able to mobilize others in his village to train in quilting. All coordination with the team members was done online and payments to the staff were made online considering the pandemic.
