= New York City AIDS Memorial =

Memorial in Manhattan, New York, U.S.

Coordinates: 40.7374°N 74.0014°W

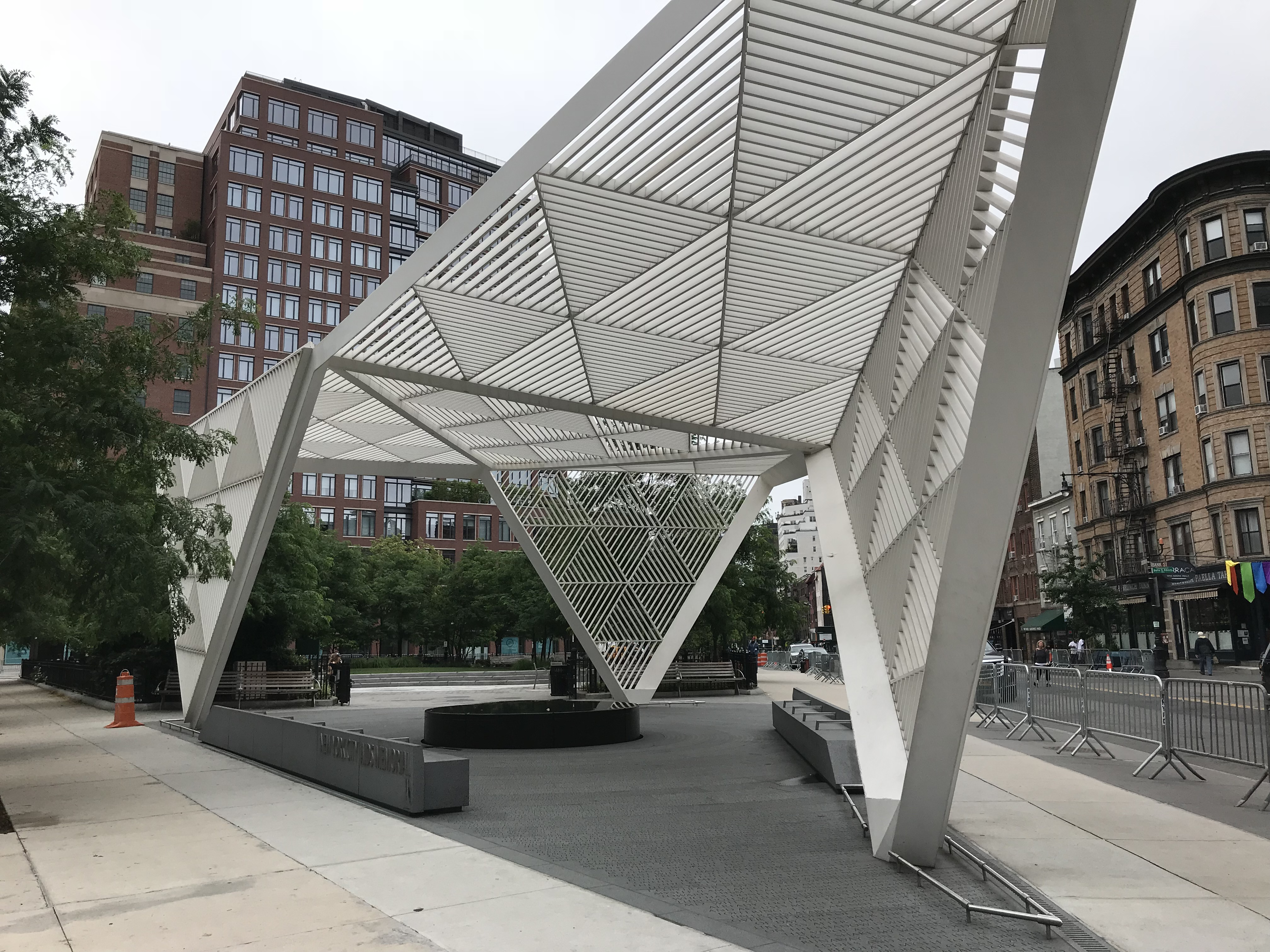
- Interactive map of New York City AIDS Memorial
- Location: Greenwich Village, Manhattan, New York City
- Type: Memorial
- Opening date: December 1, 2016
- Dedicated to: To honor New York City's 100,000+ men, women and children who have died from AIDS, and to commemorate and celebrate the efforts of the caregivers and activists

The New York City AIDS Memorial is a public memorial in Greenwich Village, Manhattan, New York City built "to honor New York City's 100,000+ men, women and children who have died from AIDS, and to commemorate and celebrate the efforts of the caregivers and activists." It is the first major space that is dedicated to the epidemic in New York City. The memorial was opened on World AIDS Day on December 1, 2016. The design was developed by the efforts of nearly 500 architects who came up with the idea of an 18-foot steel canopy as the gateway to the new St. Vincent's Hospital Park in Greenwich Village.

== Description ==
"It is impossible to convey the horror of such an epidemic and the injustice and stigma experienced by those directly affected, but public memorials serve as important reminders of our history, our shared values and the actions and attitudes we put forth as a public body during moments of crisis.

This memorial should serve, in future epidemics, both as a reminder of the dangers created, when we allow fear to rule, and of the positive outcomes that result when we unite to fight discrimination and seek solutions to our common ills."

— Stephan Jaklitsch, architect, LGBTQ Nation

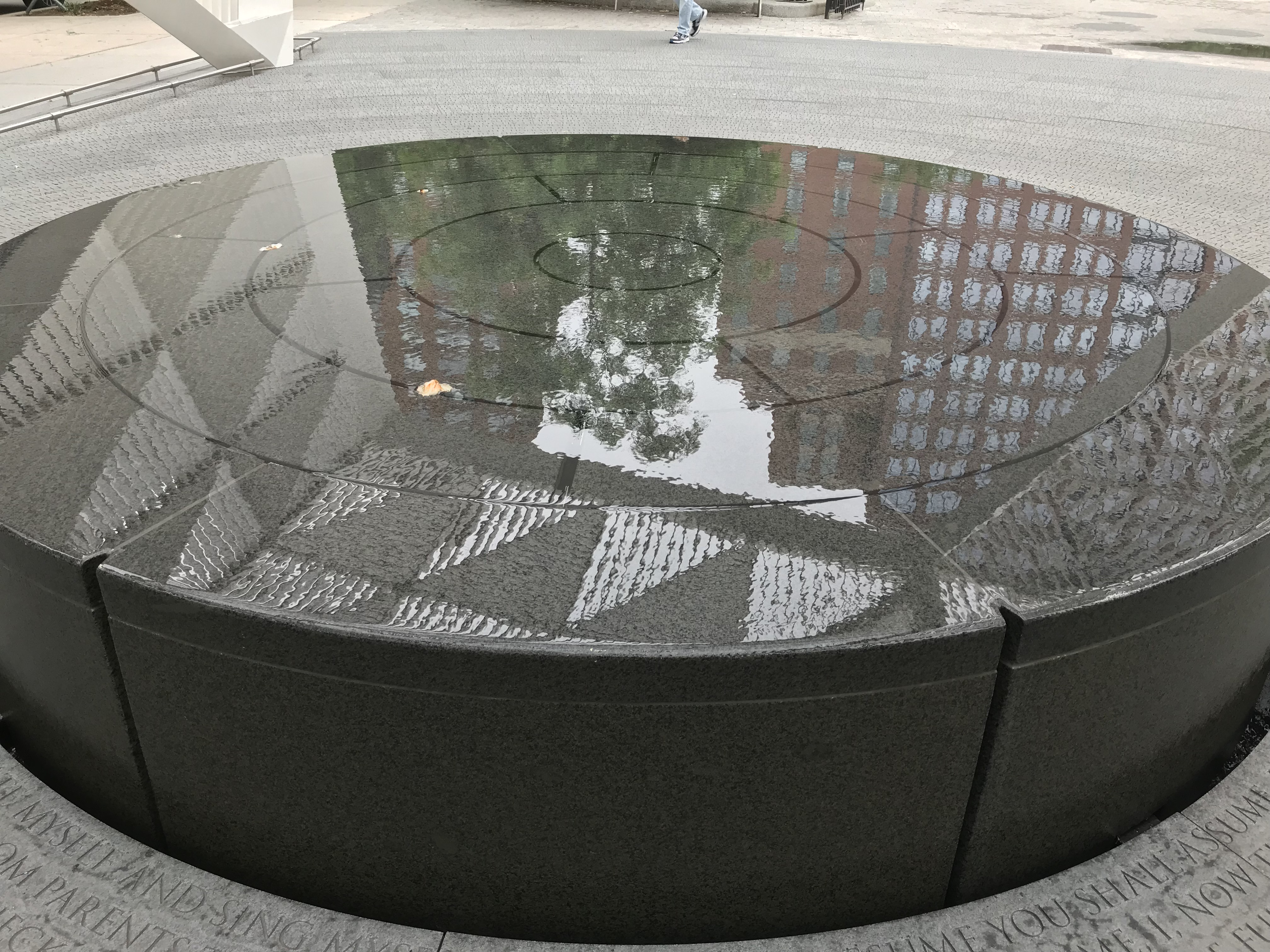
NYC AIDS Memorial Park reflecting fountain at St Vincent's Triangle in Greenwich Village.

The New York City AIDS Memorial is located on the triangular traffic island formed by 12th Street, Greenwich Avenue and Seventh Avenue in Greenwich Village. The memorial is a gateway to a new public park adjacent to the former St. Vincent's Hospital, which housed the city's first and largest AIDS ward and which is often considered the symbolic epicenter of the disease, figuring prominently in The Normal Heart, Angels in America, and other important pieces of literature and art that tell the story of the plague years in New York.

The memorial consists of an 18-foot (5.5 m) high steel canopy covering about 1,600 square feet (150 m^{2}). The structure is composed by triangles ranging from scalene to equilateral. Three triangles serve as legs to connect two large triangles at the top, so that it looks like an open airplane. Each of the triangles is filled with 16 smaller triangles and all have lines like air vents that light up in the night.

== History ==
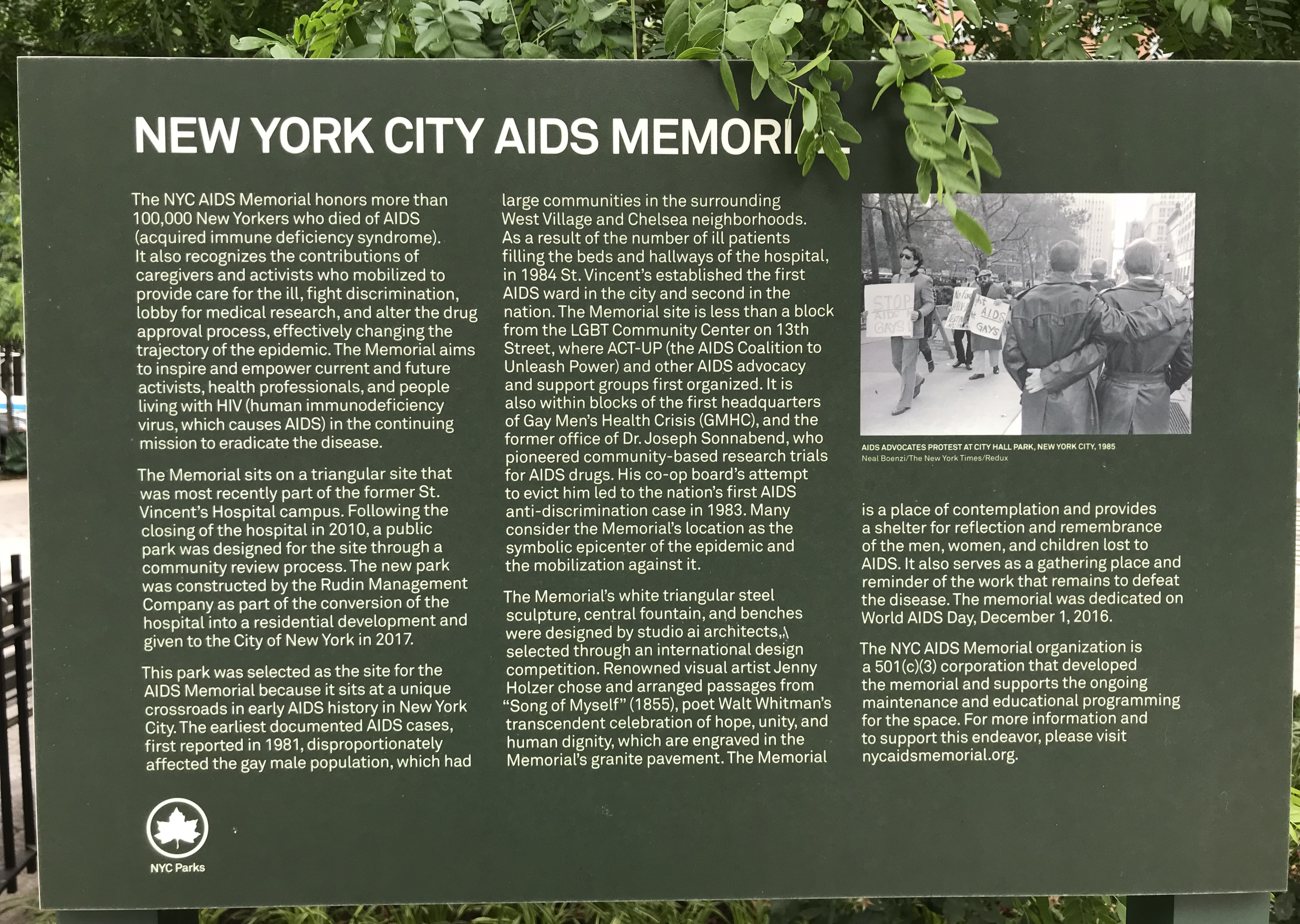
NYC AIDS Memorial Park at St Vincent's Triangle in Greenwich Village, supported by the NYC Parks Department.

In November 2011, in collaboration with magazine Architectural Record and industry database Architizer, the NYC AIDS board announced an international design competition to design the memorial park. Brooklyn-based Studio a+i, led by Mateo Paiva, Lily Lim and Esteban Erlich, won the contest and became memorial park architects. The winning design was rejected by the owner, Rudin Management. The original winning design was entitled "Infinite Forrest". It envisioned a grove of birch trees surrounded by perimeter walls that were reflective on the interior creating an infinity illusion. The exterior walls would be chalkboard slate to allow ephemeral art and messages, an homage to post 9/11 impromptu sidewalk memorials and message boards. The built memorial also features the work of visual artist Jenny Holzer whose idea was to engrave a granite panel with lines from Walt Whitman's "Song of Myself".

== See also ==
- AIDS Memorial Grove
