= Southern AIDS Living Quilt =

Website

- Company type: awareness promotion of HIV/AIDS on women
- Available in: English
- Founder: Southern AIDS Coalition
- Industry: AIDS awareness

Launched in October 2008, the Southern AIDS Living Quilt is a website dedicated to promoting awareness of the growing impact of HIV/AIDS on women in the southern United States, particularly women of color.

The site is a project of the Southern AIDS Coalition, a non-profit membership organization of government representatives, corporations, and community advocates. Using video testimonials, the Living Quilt compiles stories of women living with HIV/AIDS, as well as healthcare providers and patient advocates in the South. More than 80 women are represented on the Living Quilt from 13 southern states including Alabama, Florida, Georgia, Kentucky, Louisiana, Maryland, Mississippi, North Carolina, South Carolina, Tennessee, Texas, Virginia and Washington, D.C.

Several notable Living Quilt participants include CNN Hero Dr. Bambi W. Gaddist of the South Carolina HIV/AIDS Council, which hosted a Living Quilt event to commemorate National Black HIV/AIDS Awareness Day and state AIDS directors from Alabama, Georgia, Kentucky, Maryland, North Carolina, Virginia and Washington, D.C.

On May 13, 2009, the Living Quilt posted its 100th "patch," featuring Frances Ashe-Goins, deputy director of the Office on Women's Health at the United States Department of Health and Human Services. The milestone came as the nation recognized National Women's Health Week.

The Southern AIDS Living Quilt is a separate initiative from the NAMES Project AIDS Memorial Quilt. The South has the highest number of adults and adolescents living with AIDS in the U.S.

HIV/AIDS has a disproportionate impact on African Americans compared with members of other races and ethnicities in the U.S.
