= NAMES Project AIDS Memorial Quilt =

Memorial quilt project honoring lives lost to AIDS-related causes

- AIDS Memorial Quilt
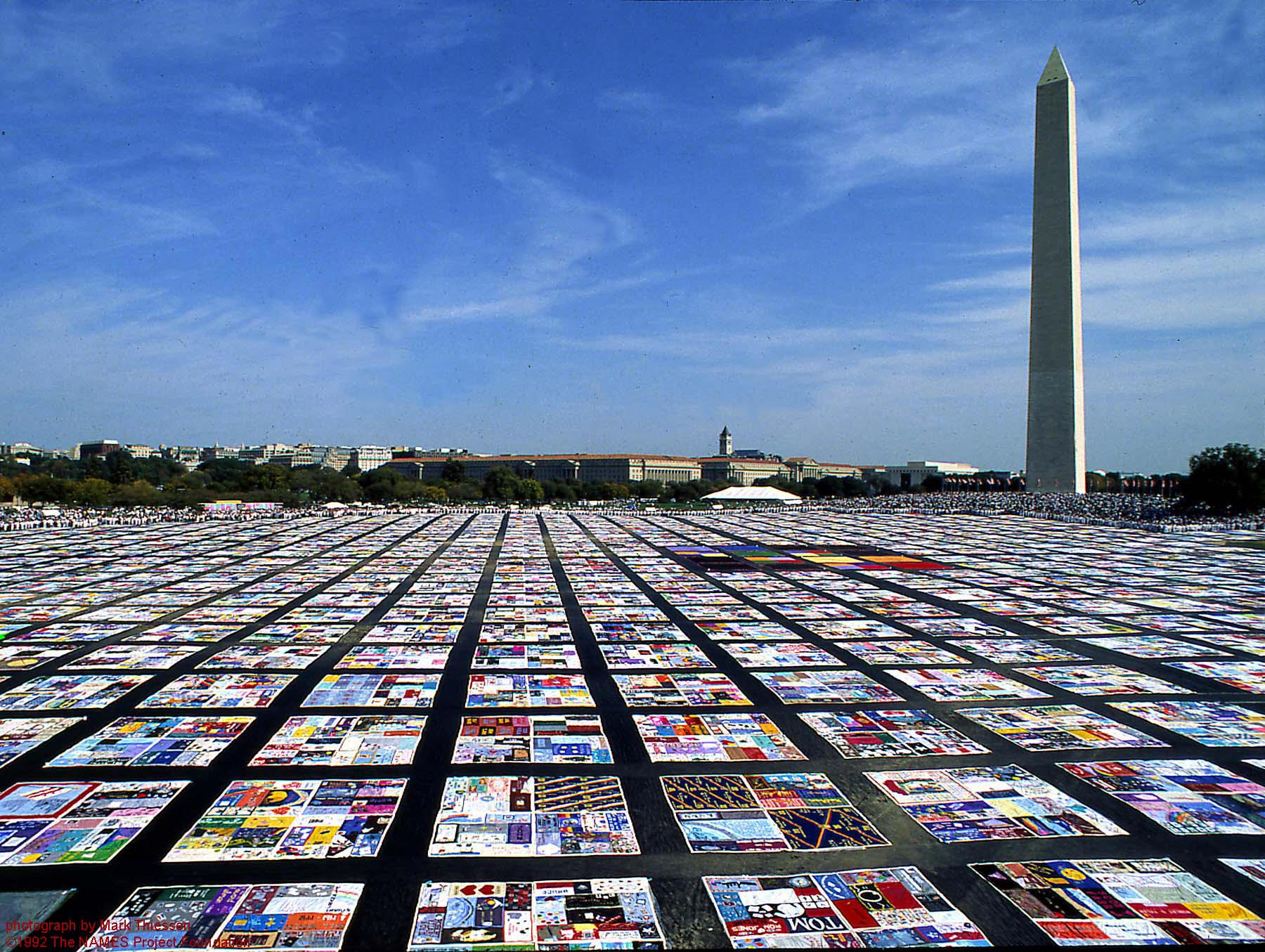
- AIDS Memorial Quilt on display at the National Mall in Washington, D.C.
- Location: Various locations during exhibitions; San Francisco (when not displayed)
- Designer: Cleve Jones
- Type: Community memorial arts project
- Material: Fabric, various materials
- Weight: 54 short tons (49,000 kg)
- Beginning date: November 27, 1985
- Inauguration date: October 11, 1987; 39 years ago
- Dedicated to: People who have lost their lives to AIDS
- Website: aidsmemorial.org/quilt
- Panel artists: Friends, family members, loved ones

The NAMES Project AIDS Memorial Quilt, often abbreviated to AIDS Memorial Quilt or AIDS Quilt, is a memorial to celebrate the lives of people who have died of AIDS-related causes. Weighing an estimated 54 tons, it is the largest piece of community folk art in the world, as of 2020. Conceived in 1985, during the early years of the AIDS pandemic, when social stigma prevented many AIDS victims from receiving funerals, it has been displayed several times on the Mall in Washington, D.C.. In 2020, it returned to San Francisco, where it is cared for by the National AIDS Memorial. The quilt has an approximate area of 1,300,000 ft^{2} (120,000 m^{2}) and can be seen virtually.

== History and structure ==
The idea for the NAMES Project Memorial Quilt was conceived on November 27, 1985, by AIDS activist Cleve Jones during the annual candlelight march, in remembrance of the 1978 assassinations of San Francisco Supervisor Harvey Milk and Mayor George Moscone. For the march, Jones had people write the names of loved ones that were lost to AIDS-related causes on signs, and then they taped the signs to the old San Francisco Federal Building. All the signs taped to the building looked like an enormous patchwork quilt to Jones, and he was inspired.

The NAMES Project officially started in 1987 in San Francisco by Jones, Mike Smith, and volunteers Joseph Durant, Jack Caster, Gert McMullin, Ron Cordova, Larkin Mayo, Steve Kirchner, and Gary Yuschalk. At that time many people who died of AIDS-related causes did not receive funerals, due to both the social stigma of AIDS felt by surviving family members and the outright refusal by many funeral homes and cemeteries to handle the deceased's remains. Lacking a memorial service or grave site, the Quilt was often the only opportunity survivors had to remember and celebrate their loved ones' lives. Volunteers created hundreds and later thousands of panels in a storefront on Market Street.

The Quilt is a memorial to and celebration of the lives of people lost to the AIDS pandemic which marks it as a prominent forerunner of the twentieth century shift in memorial design that moved towards celebrating victims or survivors. Each panel measures three by six feet (90 by 180 centimeters), approximately the size of the average grave; this connects the ideas of AIDS and death more closely.

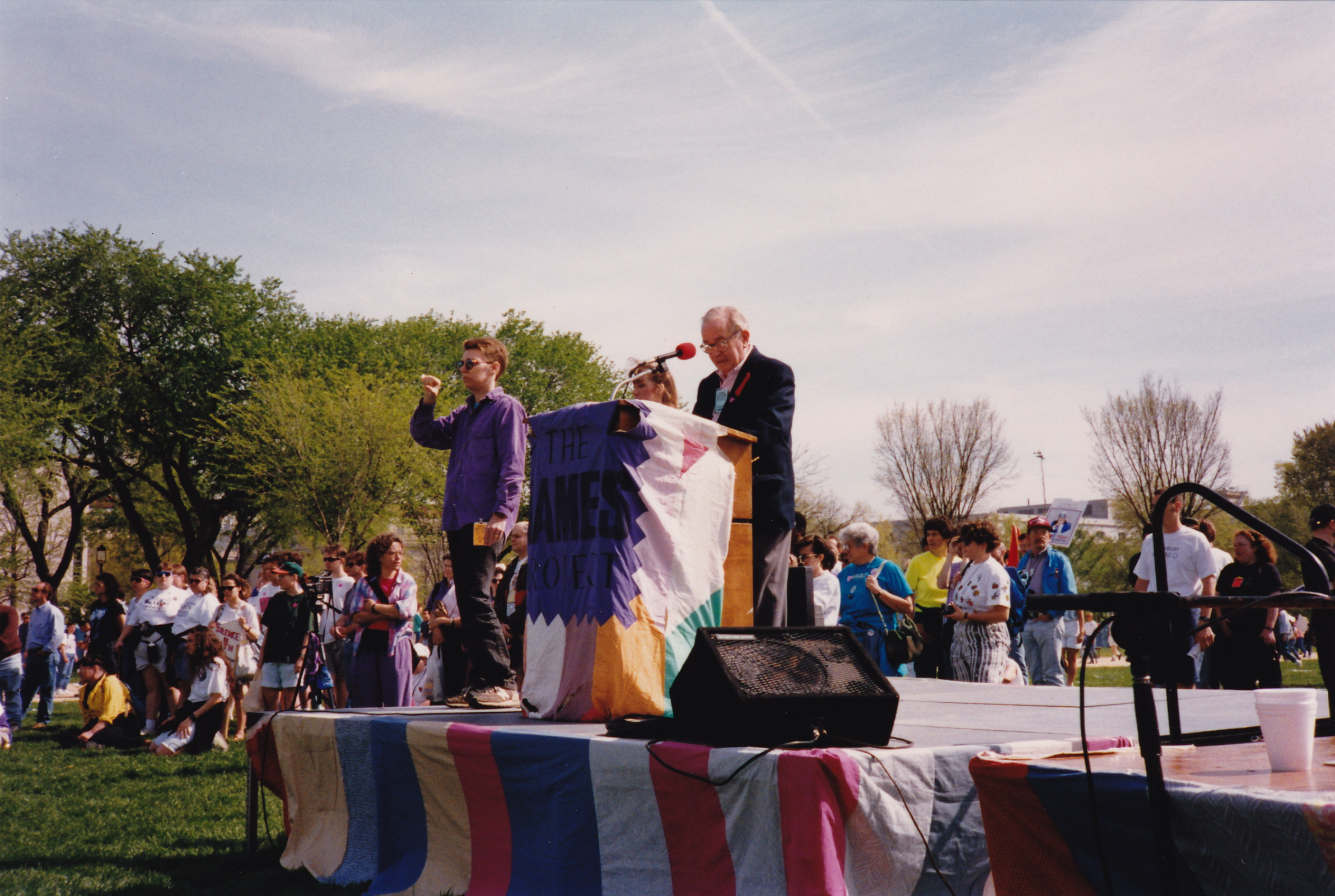
Marvin Liebman reading names at the AIDS Quilt podium, prior to the 1993 March on Washington for Lesbian, Gay, and Bi Equal Rights and Liberation.

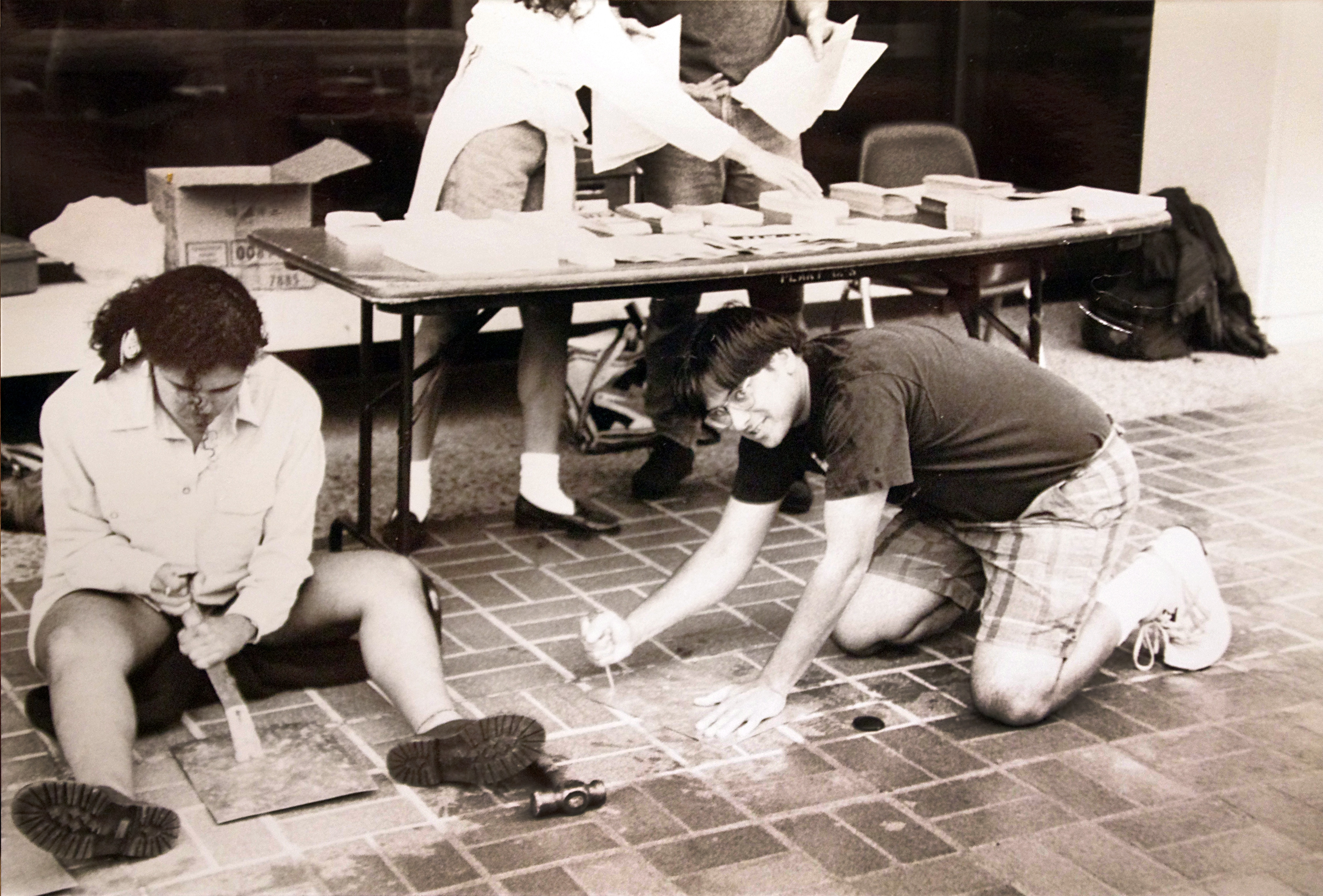
Fresno State University students making a quilt panel in 1994.

AIDS Quilt, Washington, D.C.

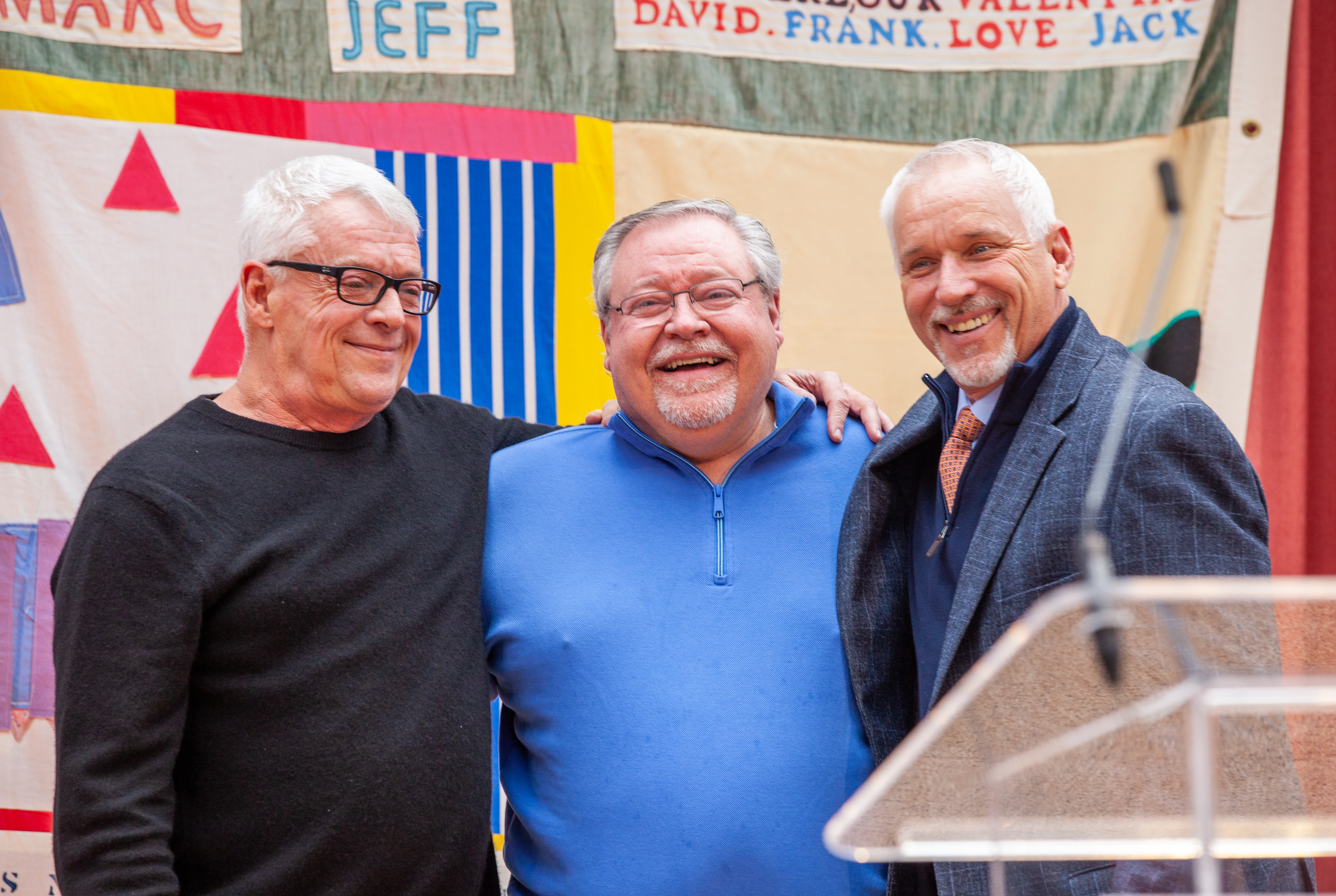
AIDS Memorial Quilt co-founders Cleve Jones and Mike Smith stand with John B. Cunningham, National AIDS Memorial Executive Director, on World AIDS Day 2019 in San Francisco.

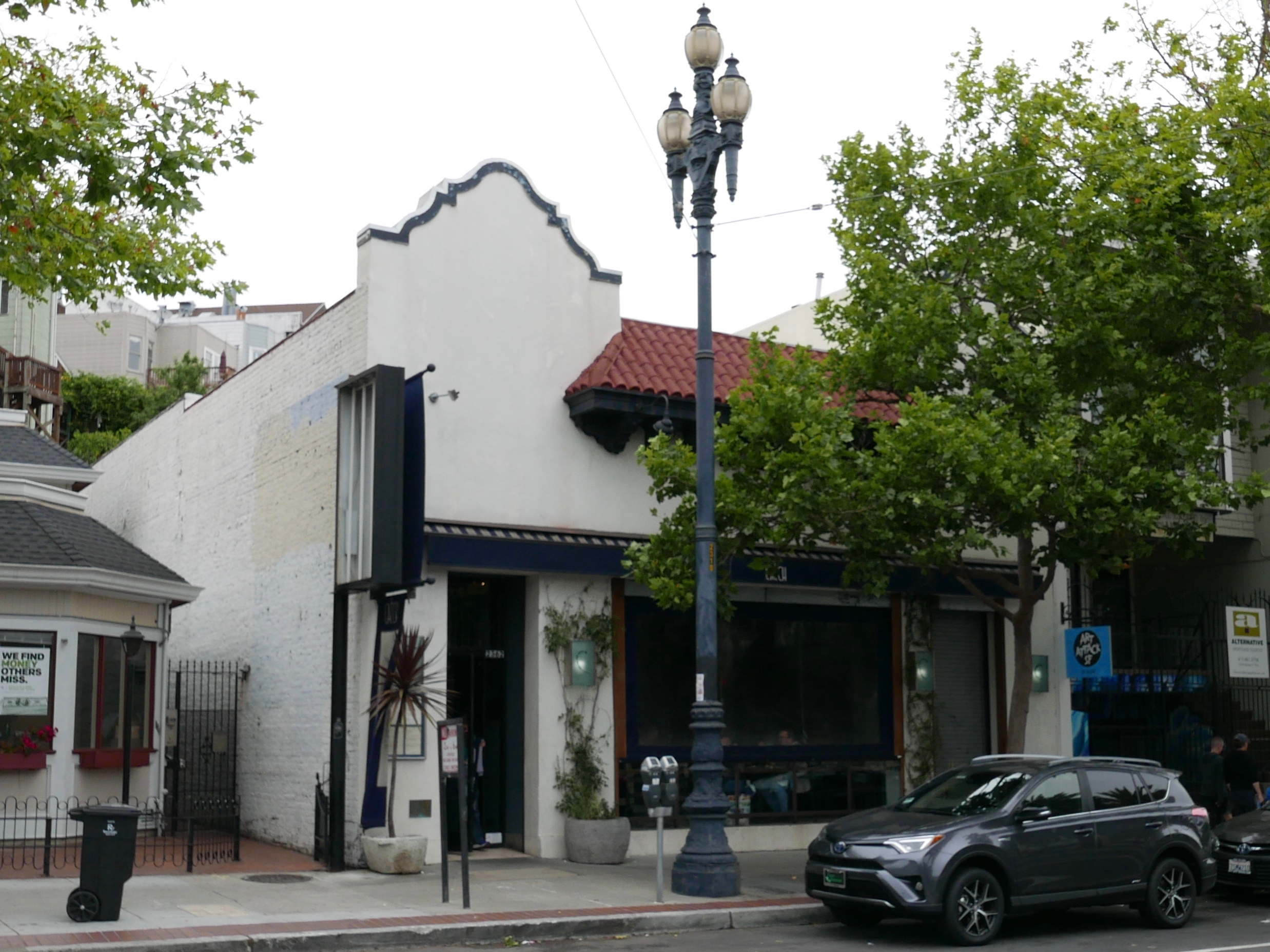
Former NAMES Project Building at 2362 Market St in San Francisco.

=== Inaugural Quilt display ===
The Quilt made its first public appearance on October 11, 1987, during the Second National March on Washington for Lesbian and Gay Rights on the National Mall. Comprising 1,920 panels and covering an area larger than a football field, 48 volunteers ceremonially unfolded the Quilt at sunrise. Participants read aloud the names represented in the Quilt, establishing a tradition followed at subsequent displays. The event drew half a million visitors that weekend.

=== Quilt tours and exhibits ===
The inaugural national tour of The Quilt took place in spring and summer 1988, raising nearly half a million dollars. Assisted by over 9,000 volunteers, a seven-person crew traveled, displayed, and expanded The Quilt. Local panels added in each city tripled its size from 1,920 to over 6,000 panels by the tour's conclusion.

The 1989 Quilt North America Tour visited 19 U.S. cities, including 7 in Canada, coinciding with local LGBT events in June and July, laying the groundwork for the Canadian AIDS Memorial Quilt. By October, the Quilt featured over 12,000 panels and was once again exhibited on The Ellipse in Washington, D.C.

In October 1992, the entire Quilt, featuring panels from every state and 28 countries, was displayed on Washington's National Mall. The quilt, more than 10 times its original size, with over 21,000 handmade panels, stretched from the base of the Washington Monument to the Lincoln Memorial in President's Park.

During President Clinton's inaugural parade on January 20, 1993, the NAMES Project participated with over 200 volunteers marching down Pennsylvania Avenue, carrying 90 Quilt panels. Notable participants in the Quilt's delegation included Miss America Leanza Cornett, actor Tom Hulce, activists Elizabeth Glaser, Mary Fisher and James Matthew Jones.

Spanning the National Mall from the Washington Monument to the U.S. Capitol in Washington, The Quilt attracted nearly 1.2 million visitors in October 1996. Over the three-day event, more than 40,000 panels were displayed. Notably, President Bill Clinton and First Lady Hillary Rodham Clinton attended, marking the last full exhibition of the Quilt on the Mall; by this point in time, the HIV/AIDS epidemic was finally seeing a major decline.

In June 2004, The Quilt featured over 8,000 new panels created since the 1996 exhibit. The display took place on The Ellipse in Washington, in observance of National HIV Testing Day.

For the AIDS Memorial Quilt's 25th anniversary in July 2012, comprising over 48,000 panels honoring 94,000 lives lost to AIDS, it returned to the National Mall and 50 sites around D.C. during the XIX International AIDS Conference. Due to its size, organizers rotated 1,500 panels daily at the Smithsonian Folklife Festival. This event marked the quilt's last full exhibition since 1996.

As of 2020, the AIDS Memorial Quilt is available online, featuring 50,000 panels with nearly 110,000 names sewn into them. The collection is searchable by block number or name, allowing users to read the stories stitched into each panel. A guide is provided for navigating the collection if required.

In June 2022, the National AIDS Memorial commemorated the 35th anniversary of the AIDS Memorial Quilt with a significant outdoor display in Golden Gate Park's Robin Williams Meadow. The exhibition showcased 3,000 panels, offering a poignant tribute to lives affected by AIDS.

In 2024, panels from the AIDS Memorial Quilt were displayed at the White House for the first time; this was an event led by President Joe Biden and First Lady Jill Biden.

=== Relocation ===
In 1997, the NAMES Project headquarters moved from San Francisco to Washington, D.C., and in 2001 the quilt panels were moved from San Francisco to Atlanta, Georgia. The NAMES Project Foundation was headquartered in Atlanta.

In 2019, the organization announced that the Quilt would be relocating to San Francisco under the permanent care and stewardship of the National AIDS Memorial. In 2020, its archives were relocated to the American Folklife Center at the Library of Congress. The AIDS Memorial Quilt is warehoused in San Francisco when not being displayed, and continues to grow, consisting of more than 50,000 individual memorial panels (to over 110,000 people) and weighing an estimated 54 tons as of 2022.

=== Goal and achievement ===
The goal of the Quilt is to bring awareness to how massive the AIDS pandemic really is, and to bring support and healing to those affected by it. Another goal is to raise funds for community-based AIDS service organizations, to increase their funding for AIDS prevention and education. As of 1996, more than $1.7 million had already been raised, and the effort continues to this day.

== Quilt construction and care ==
Three-by-six-foot (0.9-by-1.8-meter) panels made typically of fabric are created in recognition of a person who died from AIDS-related complications. The panels are made by individuals alone or in a workshop, such as Call My Name (which focuses on African American representation on the quilt) or in quilting bees, such as the one held during the 2012 Smithsonian Folklife Festival on the National Mall. Construction choices are left to the quilter and techniques such as traditional fabric quilting, embroidery, applique, paint and stencil, beading, and iron-ons are common.

Items and materials included in the panels:

- Fabrics such as lace, suede, leather, mink, taffeta, also Bubble Wrap and other kinds of plastic and even metal.
- Decorative items like pearls, quartz crystals, rhinestones, sequins, feathers, buttons.
- Clothing, such as jeans, T-shirts, gloves, boots, hats, uniforms, jackets, flip-flops.
- Items of a personal nature, such as human hair, cremation ashes, wedding rings, merit badges and other awards, car keys.
- Unusual items, such as stuffed animals, records, jockstraps, condoms, and bowling balls.

Panels are submitted to the National AIDS Memorial, along with a panel-maker identification form and a documentation letter. Occasionally, other supplemental material is donated along with the panel such as photographs of the subject. The information about the panel is recorded in a database.

Panels are backed in canvas and sewn together in blocks of eight. Grommets for hanging are attached and the blocks are numbered and photographed. The numbers help with identification and location in storage, on the quilt website, and when the quilt is displayed.

=== Examples of panels ===
Those who submit panels do not have to know the person, but they do have to feel some sort of connection with the individual that they want people to recognize. For example, to memorialize Queen lead singer Freddie Mercury, there were many panels made, two of which were a solid white background with a blue-and-black guitar, and "Freddy Mercury" written down the sides in black, with the AIDS ribbon above his name, and a purple silk with "Freddie Mercury", "Queen", and "1946–1991" in silver applique, along with two pictures of Mercury with Queen.

Many panels were also made for the actor Rock Hudson, one of which consisted of a navy blue background with silver "Rock Hudson" and stars, above a rainbow with the word "Hollywood".

At least one, for lawyer and prosecutor Roy Cohn, is not entirely complimentary. His AIDS Memorial Quilt panel is white with the words "Roy Cohn. Bully. Coward. Victim" written on it, with "Roy Cohn" in black letters, "victim" in blue, "bully" in red and "coward" in yellow.

Other panels are made by loved ones and then attached to make one large block. Some are flamboyant and loud, whereas some are more muted and simple.

== Recognition and influence ==
Panels have been accessioned into the collection of the Smithsonian Institution National Museum of American History (accession number 1998.0254.01) and featured in the book The Smithsonian's History of America in 101 Objects.

=== Awards ===
- The NAMES Project was nominated for a Nobel Peace Prize in 1989.
- In 2002, the NAMES Project Chicago Chapter was inducted into the Chicago Gay and Lesbian Hall of Fame.

=== Documentaries ===
- The Quilt is the subject of the 1989 Peabody Award– and Academy Award–winning documentary film, Common Threads: Stories from the Quilt, produced by Rob Epstein and Bill Couturié, and narrated by Dustin Hoffman.
- Never to Be Forgotten is a Philo T. Farnsworth Award–winning 54-minute video created by Karen Peper which documents the Quilt's June 1988 visit to Detroit, Michigan. This display was part of a 20-city tour initiated immediately after the 1987 Washington, DC, inaugural showing. The video begins with footage of the opening ceremony from the Washington DC display and then moves to coverage of the Detroit event. Included are the opening and closing ceremonies at Cobo Hall along with a look at the set up and take down of the display. Volunteers share their feelings about participating in the event and the viewer is given a close-up look at the individual panels. Peper also shot extensive footage of the Quilt's visit to Columbus, OH; Chicago, IL; and the 1987, 1993, and 1996 Washington, D.C., showings. (All video footage is archived at ONE Archives at the USC Libraries in Los Angeles, CA.)

=== Music ===
- In 1994, Reba McEntire recorded the song “She Thinks His Name Was John,” written by Sandy Knox and Steve Rosen. The song depicts a young woman who contracts AIDS after a one-night stand. During performances of the song at McEntire's concerts, screens behind her displayed billowing fabric, depicting the laying of 12x12 panels during opening ceremonies before finally landing on a panel bearing the name John.
- Songwriter Tom Brown wrote the song "Jonathan Wesley Oliver, Jr." about the Quilt in 1988.
- In 1990, John Corigliano's Symphony No. 1, inspired by The AIDS Memorial Quilt, premiered in New York.
- Elegies for Angels, Punks and Raging Queens, a song cycle developed in the late 1980s with music by Janet Hood and lyrics and additional text by Bill Russell, features songs and monologues inspired by The Quilt.
- In 1992, the The AIDS Quilt Songbook premiered. Lyric baritone William Parker compiled this collection of new musical works about the devastation of AIDS, soliciting them from composers with whom he had previously worked.
- Washington D.C.'s Different Drummers (DCDD) and the Lesbian and Gay Chorus of Washington (LGCW) commissioned Quilt Panels from composer Robert Maggio, and the piece premiered in 2003.
- The NAMES Project was the basis for the musical Quilt, A Musical Celebration.

=== Television ===
- The Quilt was displayed on the ABC Soap Opera One Life to Live in 1992.
- The AIDS Memorial Quilt was mentioned and shown during the years that General Hospital held their Nurses Ball (1994–2001) and raised money for AIDS research. The show's fictional character, Michael "Stone" Cates, was celebrated with a quilt block in 1996.
- In A&E's Biography of the 100 Most Influential People of the Millennium, the 94th individual featured is "Patient Zero," recognized as the first AIDS victim. The AIDS Memorial Quilt is showcased at 9:17 within the program, which aired in 1999 and includes footage from the National Mall.
- The Quilt is displayed in the last scene of the Showtime miniseries Fellow Travelers in 2023.
- A panel for the character of Pray Tell in the Ryan Murphy show POSE was added to the AIDS Memorial Quilt for the series finale.

=== Comics ===
- Cartoonist Gerard Donelan, specializing in single-panel comics depicting gay men and women in everyday life, contributed cartoons, pamphlets, and posters to the NAMES Project. These pieces were meant to spread awareness about safe-sex practices for gay people and to garner support for the NAMES Project.

=== Projects inspired by NAMES ===
The AIDS Memorial Quilt was the first of its kind as a continually growing monument created piecemeal by thousands of individuals, and as of 2007, it constituted the largest piece of community folk art in the world. The Quilt was followed by, and inspired a number of memorials and awareness projects, both AIDS-related and otherwise. Examples of these include:

- The K.I.A. Memorial Quilt, created to remember those U.S. Armed Forces members killed in the Iraq War.
- Following the September 11 attacks on the United States, a number of quilt projects were created memorializing the victims.
  - September 11 Quilts Memorial Exhibition
  - United In Memory
  - The World Trade Center Memorial Quilt
  - America's 9-11 Memorial Quilts
- Many other medical conditions also now have quilts, for example:
  - Huntington's disease
  - Congenital heart disease
  - Breast cancer

There are also quilts for sub-sects of the AIDS Pandemic, including Canada,1989, Children, 2010, North Californians, 2008, Australia, 1988, and New Zealand, 1988. The Irish Names Quilt was created in 1990. In the mid-1990s, Minneapolis architect David Madson designed a thesis for the University of Minnesota with the aim of building a quilt for HIV/AIDS victims in Minneapolis. Inspired by the New York City AIDS Memorial, Madson envisioned such design for the memorial. He was murdered by his former partner and spree killer Andrew Cunanan in May 1997, with his thesis being posthumously certified by the University of Minnesota.

Contemporary textile artists such as L.J. Roberts and Paul Yore have spoken about being directly inspired by the NAMES Project AIDS Memorial Quilt.

"Virtual" AIDS Memorial Quilts have also been created:

- Project Stitch "Digital Quilt"
- Second Life
- AIDS Action Committee of Massachusetts
- Southern AIDS Living Quilt
- Columbia University AIDS Memorial
- Canadian AIDS Memorial Quilt

During the COVID-19 pandemic, a quilt volunteer, McMullin, made protective masks for community service organizations from quilting fabric.

The quilt inspired the creation of the UK AIDS Memorial Quilt that commemorates the lives of almost 400 individuals affected by HIV/AIDS from the United Kingdom.

== Display location ==
In November 2019 the NAMES Project Foundation and House Speaker Nancy Pelosi announced that the quilt would relocate to San Francisco under the permanent care and stewardship of the National AIDS Memorial, starting in 2020. The Project's archives were gifted to the joint care with the American Folklife Center at the U.S. Library of Congress, allowing for greater public access. This action returns the quilt to San Francisco, where the project began.

== See also ==
- Art of the AIDS Crisis
- New York City AIDS Memorial
