= L.J. Roberts =

American textile artist

- Born: 1980 (age 45–46); Royal Oak, Michigan
- Education: University of Vermont (BA) California College of the Arts (MFA, MA)
- Known for: Textile arts, artivism
- Notable work: The Queer Houses of Brooklyn in the Three Towns of Breukelen, Boswyck, and Midwout during the 41st Year of the Stonewall Era
- Website: ljroberts.net

L.J. Roberts is an American textile artist. Roberts, who is genderqueer and uses singular they pronouns, explores queer and feminist politics in their work.

== Early life and education ==
=== Early life ===
Roberts grew up in a suburb of Detroit, and they were initially taught to knit by their grandmother at age seven. At thirteen, they left home and moved in with another family. As a teenager, they were sent to an Episcopal all-girls boarding school in Maryland despite being Jewish, at a time when they were "dykey, angry, rebellious" and "grappling with [their] own sexuality and gender". In 1996, they viewed the AIDS Memorial Quilt in Washington D.C.; this was the first time they'd seen "queer lexicon and militancy". Roberts was then sent to a boarding school in California in an attempt to "feminize" their behavior and dress.

=== Education ===
Roberts attended college at the University of Vermont, where they resumed knitting after suffering a severe injury that limited their access to facilities. In 2003 they created their first activist textile piece, dropping a hand-knit pink triangular banner from the campus church steeple that read "Mom Knows Now"; this served both as their coming out and as an homage to ACT UP activism against AIDS. Roberts graduated from the University of Vermont with bachelor's degrees in English and studio art.

Roberts then attended the California College of the Arts in San Francisco, doing further artivism there by knitting the words "& Crafts" and installing them on signs for the school, which had recently dropped "and Crafts" from its name. This work was later recreated to become a part of the collection at the Oakland Museum of California. Roberts graduated from CCA with a Master of Arts in visual and critical studies and a Master of Fine Arts in textiles.

== Career ==
The Queer Houses of Brooklyn in the Three Towns of Breukelen, Boswyck, and Midwout during the 41st Year of the Stonewall Era (based on a 2010 drawing by Daniel Rosza Lang/Levitsky with 24 illustrations by Buzz Slutzky on printed pin-back buttons) (2011) at the Renwick Gallery in Washington, DC in 2022

Roberts's work consists primarily of large-scale installations knitted with children's toy knitting cranks including sock making machines and Barbie knitting tools. Throughout their career, Roberts has been most influenced by activist art about HIV/AIDS, and uses their craft as a form of activism as well. Their current artist's statement regarding craft, is to "reclaim the mastery of craft to create an alternative set of tools that could potentially dismantle 'the master's house." This is part of their passion in using craft, especially knitting, to push the boundaries in institutions. Moreover, Roberts finds that the issues of marginality they encounter as a queer, gender non-conforming and non-binary person, directly mirror the position(s) of textile and craft within visual culture. All of these materials are also portable, accessible, and can adapt to a variety of circumstances.

Their work has been shown in galleries and exhibitions throughout the United States. A work of Roberts, The Queer Houses of Brooklyn in the Three Towns of Breukelen, Boswyck, and Midwout during the 41st Year of the Stonewall Era, was displayed in the Smithsonian American Art Museum. The work, which was subsequently purchased by the Smithsonian, was part of the 2012 40 Under 40: Craft Future exhibition in the Renwick Gallery, featuring artists born since 1972. In 2017, Roberts worked publicly in the galleries of the Museum of Arts and Design as part of the exhibition Studio Views: Craft in the Expanded Field. They knitted, sewed, and appliquéd a flat, life-sized van inspired by the 1970s queer van gang, the Van Dykes. Roberts has explained that the work foregrounds both the pleasures and political dimensions of queer spaces, while imagining a uptopian vision of trans-inclusive community and belonging.

Roberts is a past co-chair of the Queer Caucus for Art, an affiliate of the College Art Association. Roberts has a published essay, "Reimagining Craft Identities Using Tactics of Queer Theory", in the 2011 book Extra/Ordinary: Craft and Contemporary Art. In 2015, Roberts was one of nine recipients of the White House Champions of Change award for LGBT Artists.

== Personal life ==
Roberts splits their time between Brooklyn, New York and Joshua Tree, California. Their partner is choreographer and performance artist J Dellecave. Roberts has two Chihuahua mix dogs, Sparky and Ziggy.
