= NAMES Project AIDS Quilt Songbook =

The AIDS Quilt Songbook is an ongoing collaborative song-cycle with subsequent additions responding to the stigma surrounding, ignorance of, and grief caused by the spread of HIV/AIDS, serving as a companion work to the NAMES Project AIDS Memorial Quilt. While its original printed edition consists of 18 songs with texts and music by American poets and composers, as a whole it includes numerous uncollected works.

== Origins, purpose, and vision ==
American lyric baritone William Parker (5 August 1943 – 29 March 1993) found himself dissatisfied with the treatment of the HIV/AIDS epidemic within the musical community — particularly with AIDS benefit concerts, which were composed of “standard” repertoire and often did not mention HIV or AIDS and their effects explicitly. Inspired by this and the book Poets for Life: Seventy-Six Poets Respond to AIDS, Parker contacted several prominent composers, including Lee Hoiby, Ricky Ian Gordon, and Libby Larsen, to create art songs inspired by the experiences of those living, coping with, and dying from the disease. Keith Ward describes the work as going “well beyond Parker’s mission.”

In an interview with Opera News, Parker stated his initial motivations for the project:

The AIDS Quilt Songbook invites people to take risks. Some texts are very graphic. They are about taking medication, being sick, throwing up, having to take it over again, the night sweats — the horror of the number of diseases that exist. We’re not sugar coating it and saying, ‘Well, we’re just having a little difficulty.’ We must show some of the rough sides. After all, most of the songs are about crucial times in our lives — someone has died, someone has left you, you’ve inherited a lot of money, the boy’s gotten the girl. So, why can’t we sing about AIDS?

Parker's vision for the songbook was similar to that of the original AIDS Memorial Quilt—for the song-cycle to evolve with each musical addition. Parker also wanted an expansion in the musical forces used, which would occur in the Songbook’s later incarnations.

== Premiere ==
The AIDS Quilt Songbook premiered on 4 July 1992 in New York City at the Lincoln Center’s Alice Tully Hall. Parker debuted the cycle with three other baritones: Kurt Ollman, William Sharp, and Sanford Sylvan accompanied by Alkan Marks, Fred Hersch, John Musto, Ned Rorem, David Breitman, Donald St. Pierre, Steven Blier, Richard Thomas, William Huckaby, and Ricky Ian Gordon, with David Krakaer on clarinet. In Dr. Kyle Ferrill’s interview with William Sharp, Sharp observed Parker as “absolutely glowing. I don’t think I’ve ever seen anyone so happy. It seemed to be literally sustaining his life. When he addressed the audience, one wanted him to be able to stand in that bright, warm light with his performers on stage, his family, friends and fans in the house, and speak forever.” Despite the success of the previous evening, the following day's recording session at The Academy of Arts and Letters began with Parker too ill to record. For this reason, the songs Parker premiered, “The Second Law,” “Perineo,” and “The Enticing Lane,” are not on the album.

== The Printed Collection ==
The original 18 songs were published by Boosey and Hawkes in 1993. All profits from The AIDS Quilt Songbook score and CD are donated to The AIDS Resource Center and other related efforts.

1. “Fury,” Donald Wheelock (b. 1940); Text: Susan Snively (b. 1945)
2. “blues for an imaginary valentine,” Music and Text: Fred Hersch (b. 1955)
3. “Heartbeats,” John Musto (b. 1954); Text: Melvin Dixon (1950 – 1992)
4. “A Dream of Nightingales,” Ned Rorem (b. 1923); Text: David Bergman (b. 1950)
5. “Walt Whitman in 1989,” Chris DeBlasio (1959-1993); Text: Perry Brass (b.1947)
6. “The 80s Miracle Diet,” David Krakaur (b. 1959); Text: Melvin Dixon (1950 – 1992)
7. “For Richard,” Annea Lockwood (b.1939); Text: Eve Ensler (b. 1953)
8. “Fairy Book Lines,” Donald St. Pierre; Text: Charles Barber (1962 – 1992)
9. “Vaslav’s Song,” William Bolcom (b. 1938); Text: Ethyl Eichelberger (1945 – 1990)
10. “AIDS Anxiety,” Music and Text: Richard Pearson Thomas
11. “The Flute of Interior Time,” John Harbison (b. 1938); Text: Karbir (1440 – 1508) trans. Robert Bly (b. 1926)
12. “The Birds of Sorrow,” Carl Byron; Text: Ron Schreiber (1934 – 2004)
13. “Investiture at Cecconi’s,” Lee Hoiby (b. 1926); Text: James Merrill (1926 – 1995)
14. “A Certain Light,” Elizabeth Brown (b. 1953); Text: Marie Howe (b. 1950)
15. “I Never Knew,” Music and Text: Ricky Ian Gordon (b 1956)
16. “The Second Law,” Richard Wilson (b. 1941); Text: Stephen Sandy (b. 1934)
17. “Perineo,” Libby Larsen (b. 1950); Text: Roberto Echavarren (b. 1944)
18. “The Enticing Lane,” Stephen Houtz (b. 1956); Text: Christopher Hewitt (1946 – 2004)

== Additional contributions and premieres ==
=== The Minnesota AIDS Quilt Songbook additions ===
Organized by Marsha Hunter and Brian Kent of the Minnesota chapter of the American Composer's Forum, The Minnesota AIDS Quilt Songbook debuted on World AIDS Day, 1 December 1992, and was held at the Walker Art Center in Minneapolis. This would be William Parker's last public performance before his death on 29 March 1993. Too weak to stand, Parker was held up by his fellow performer's during Swing low, Sweet Chariot. Additions include:

1. “Positive Women: Susan,” Janika Vandervelde (b. 1955); Text: Susan Gladstone
2. “Let It Go,”Carol Barnett (b. 1949); Text: Michael Estork
3. “We're All Pharaohs When We Die,” Music and Text: David John Olsen
4. “Domination Of Black,” Craig Carnahan (b. 1951); Text: Dan Conner
5. “The Loons,” Carolyn Jennings (b. 1936); Text: Michael Estork
6. “When I Am Dead, My Dearest,” Daniel Kallman (b. 1956); Text: Christina Rossetti (1830-1894)
7. “The Blue Animals,” Aaron Jay Kernis (b.1960); Text: Jon Anderson (1940 – 2007)
8. “As Imperceptibly As Grief,” Cary John Franklin; Text: Emily Dickinson (1830 –1886)

=== The Estate Project’s additions ===
In 1991, as an extension of the Alliance of the Arts, The Estate Project was created to aid artists’ in estate planning, especially artists’ affected by HIV/AIDS. The Estate Project also seeks to preserve artwork in all disciplines concerning the AIDS Crisis for future generations. Besides the songs listed below, additional songs have premiered, but never were collected for the AIDS Quilt Songbook. The premiered and collected, but unpublished additions include:

1. “A Musical Kaddish 'In Sea',” Thomas J. Anderson
2. “Stele,” Sidney Corbett; Text: Denise Levertov
3. “The Reassurance,” Stephen Jaffe
4. “Dolphins,” Scott Lindroth and Text by Richard Harteis
5. “The Hill,” Music and Text: Robert Ward
6. “AIDSSONG,” Mark Alburger
7. “Song on a Text by William Blake,” Robert Copanna
8. “Over Salt River” for soprano, English horn and piano, Tina Davidson
9. “To Daffodils” for baritone and cello, Daniel Dorff
10. “Facing,” Paul Epstein
11. “Trembling Song” David Finko
12. “And Is There Anyone at All?” Margaret Garwood
13. “Eagle Poem,” Janice Hamer
14. “To Be Laid to Sleep in a Garden,” Music and Text: Harry Hewitt
15. “Dirge in Woods,” Jan Krzywicki
16. “Consolation,” Gerald Levinson
17. “In the Middle of Summer”for tenor, baritone and piano, Robert Maggio; Text: Howard Kaplan
18. "Most this amazing," Philip Maneval
19. “From Psalm 116” for baritone and ensemble, James Primosch
20. “Arcadian Shadows” for soprano, clarinet, cello and piano, Jay Reise
21. “Spring and Fall,” Kile Smith
22. “Mort j'appelle” for male voice, viola, bass and piano, Andrew Stiller; Text: François Villon
23. “Prayer,“ Anthony Watson
24. “The Path of Night and Smoke,” Adam Wernick
25. “I Could Lie Down,” Lawrence Ebert; Text: Percy Bysshe Shelley
26. “So Live,” Lawrence Ebert; Text: William Cullen Bryant

=== The Chicago AIDS Quilt Songbook additions ===
From the efforts of the Artistic Director of the Chicago Opera Vanguard, Eric Reda, The Chicago AIDS Quilt Songbook and its accompanying performance The Chicago AIDS Quilt Songbook: Benefit for Season of Concern, premiered on World AIDS Day, 1 December 2008. The performance included an award ceremony honoring volunteers of Season for Concern. These additions brought to fruition Parker's hope for variation in the genres and forces used. The compositions below include duets, electronic music, and vernacular styles. Additions include:

1. “Birthday,” Music and Text: Stephen Kartes
2. “Good to See You’re Alive,” Jon Steinhagen; Text: David Cerda
3. “The Way to Hell,” Seth Boustead; Text: Ivan Faute
4. “Quilt Duets,” Lawrence Axelrod; Text: Mark Doty, Jim Rondone, Anna Akhmatava, and the NAMES Project Website
5. “Keyboards, Characters” Patricia Morehead; Text: Nina Corwin
6. “Believe,” Music and Text: Karen Mooney
7. “Home Movies,” Robert Steel
8. “Kiss me,” Augusta Read Thomas; Text: E.E. Cummings
9. “Le Beau Est Toujours Bizarre,” Natasha Bogojevich; Text: Milan Pribsic
10. “You’re so Gay,” Music and Text: George Howe
11. “Kinda Scary,” Amos Gillespe; Text: Philip Dawkins
12. “A Total Stranger One Black Day / When any mortal (even the most odd),” William Jason Raynovich; Text: E.E. Cummings
13. “Atripla!” Music and Text: Eric Reda
14. “Death Spiral,” Music and Text: Evan Kuchar
15. “A Moment’s Vigil,” Josh Schmidt; Text: Lisa Dillman

== Discography ==
1. The AIDS Quilt Songbook. Various artists, Harmonia Mundi 907602, 1994, compact disc.
2. Heartbeats: New Songs from the Minnesota for the AIDS Quilt Songbook, Innova 500, 1995, compact disc.
