= AIDS Memorial Grove =

National monument commemorating AIDS victims

National AIDS Memorial Grove
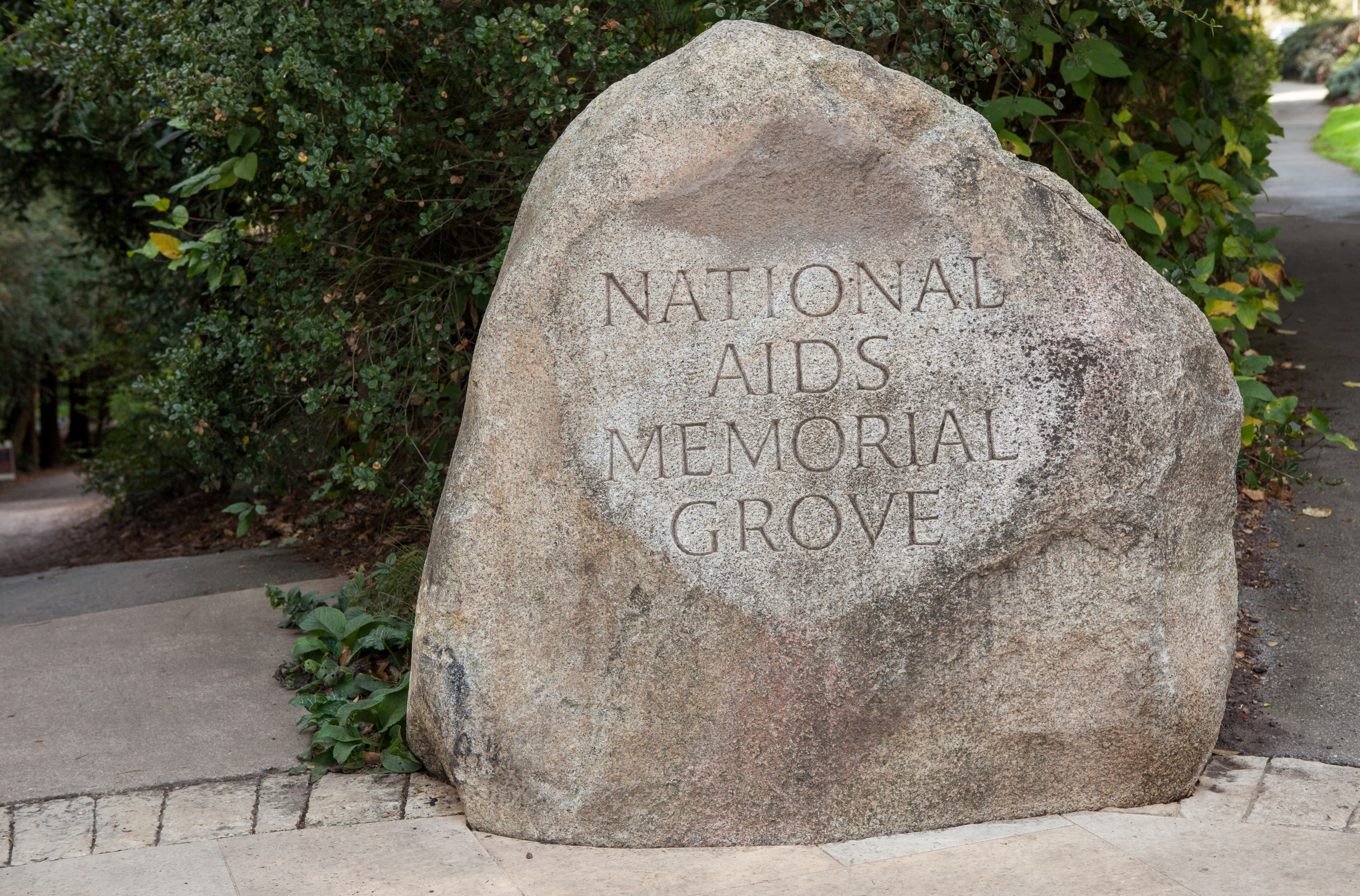
- 7-ton Sierra granite boulder inscribed with Grove sign, at the 'Main Portal' terrace entrance, in Golden Gate Park

- Location within California Location within the United States
- Location: Golden Gate Park, San Francisco, California, U.S.
- Coordinates: 37°46′12″N 122°27′41″W
- Area: 7.5 acres (3.0 ha)
- Designation: National Memorial of the United States
- Established: Created: September 1991. Nationalized: November 1996.
- Website: https://www.aidsmemorial.org

The National AIDS Memorial Grove, or "The Grove," is located at the de Laveaga Dell in eastern Golden Gate Park, in San Francisco, California.

The Grove is a dedicated space and place in the national landscape where the millions of Americans touched directly or indirectly by HIV/AIDS can gather to heal, hope, and remember. The mission of the AIDS Memorial Grove is to provide a healing sanctuary and to promote learning and understanding of the human tragedy of the AIDS pandemic.

== Introduction ==
Congress and the President of the United States approved the Omnibus Parks and Public Lands Management Act of 1996 in 1996, which officially set aside the deLaveaga Dell land in Golden Gate Park as the site for the first AIDS memorial in the nation.

The Grove continues through the additional services and financial support given by numerous individuals, corporations, and foundations. Thousands of community volunteers have ensured over 20 years that continuous gardening and regular maintenance occurs, along with periodic enhancement projects.

The Grove serves as an important sanctuary for people, from locals to world visitors, a refuge for memories and a place of new enjoyment.

Most memorials are built after the struggle is over. This battle rages on and we cannot wait, lest any one of our loved ones lost to AIDS be forgotten.

The Grove's former executive director and current board member, Thom Weyand, has said that "part of the beauty of the grove is that as a memorial which receives no federal money, it is blessedly removed from the fight over the controversy of AIDS."

=== Access ===
The Main Portal entrance is at 856 Stanyan Street in eastern Golden Gate Park. The West Portal and South Portal are the two other designated entrances, also on park roads surrounding The Grove. Other secondary walkways enter naturally from the park roads and adjacent park areas.

Access to the Grove is open during the park's hours. Free guided tours—excursions are given monthly for the public (except winter).

== History of The Grove ==
=== AIDS Memorial Grove ===
1988

- Isabel Wade and Nancy McNally envision:

"A beautiful grove where people could find solitude and hope while remembering loved ones... a place to provide a positive focus for our grief."

- The idea was shared with mutual friends to create a living tribute to friends lost to AIDS.

1989

- The Grove Steering Committee is formed to pursue the idea with the San Francisco Recreation and Parks Department.
- (Winter) Three donations, in memory of prominent local landscape architect Stephen Marcus, provide initial funds for the Grove as a project of Friends of the Urban Forest.

1990

- (February) The Grove Steering Committee chooses the long-neglected de Laveaga Dell for the AIDS Memorial Grove.
  - The de Laveaga Dell

The de Laveaga Dell was created through a gift from the estate of Jose Vicente de Laveaga in 1898. When the Dell was opened to the public on June 21, 1921, it included a lake, meandering stream, beds of irises, over-hanging oaks, and spectacular ferns. John McLaren supervised the development, that also featured rare rhododendrons, lush camellias, and artfully constructed faux boulders.
In the early days, the Dell was known as the Deer Glen and used by the zoo to house animals. In addition, there was a bear housed in the rise at the far western end, now known as the 'Fern Grotto'.
The Dell was well maintained during the first half of the 20th century, but later suffered from a lack of funds for maintenance.

- (November) The first fundraiser was held at the residence of steering committee member James C Hormel.

1991

- (September) The first Volunteer Workday in the Grove — a Ground Breaking with Mayor Art Agnos and 75 community volunteers.
- Twenty-two Bay Area landscape architects, garden designers, architects, artists and park personnel, under the guidance of designer Garrett Eckbo, developed the basic design and Master Plan for the AIDS Memorial Grove.

1992

- The AIDS Memorial Grove design's Master Plan is approved by the San Francisco Park Commission.
- The Grove Steering Committee agrees to work with volunteers to clean up and restore the de Laveaga Dell.

The Committee also raised funds for the AIDS Memorial Grove Endowment — to commence paying for a city gardener position at the Grove, and to support maintenance of the Grove in perpetuity.
This project support configuration of volunteers and an endowment created a model to emulate for public—private partnerships in public spaces.

1993

- (July) Kerry Enright hired as first Grove Executive Director. Initial position funds provided by Columbia Foundation and James C. Hormel.

The AIDS Memorial Grove and the City of San Francisco sign a ninety-nine year lease for the de Laveaga Dell site.

1994

- (December) First official observance of World AIDS Day in the AIDS Memorial Grove.

1995

- (February) The 'Main Portal' is dedicated by benefactor Steve Silver, the creator and producer of San Francisco's Beach Blanket Babylon, on his 51st (and last) birthday. In Steve's words:

"The Grove represents the spirit of the people who have left and the memories that will always be there."

- (July) The first full-time gardener funded by the Grove begins as part of agreement with the San Francisco Parks Dept. The full-time gardener, Joan Chase Velluntini, has worked at Golden Gate Park for 20 years.
- (December) On World AIDS Day the 7 ton Sierra granite boulder with inscribed Grove sign is installed at the entrance terrace of the 'Main Portal'.

=== National AIDS Memorial Grove ===
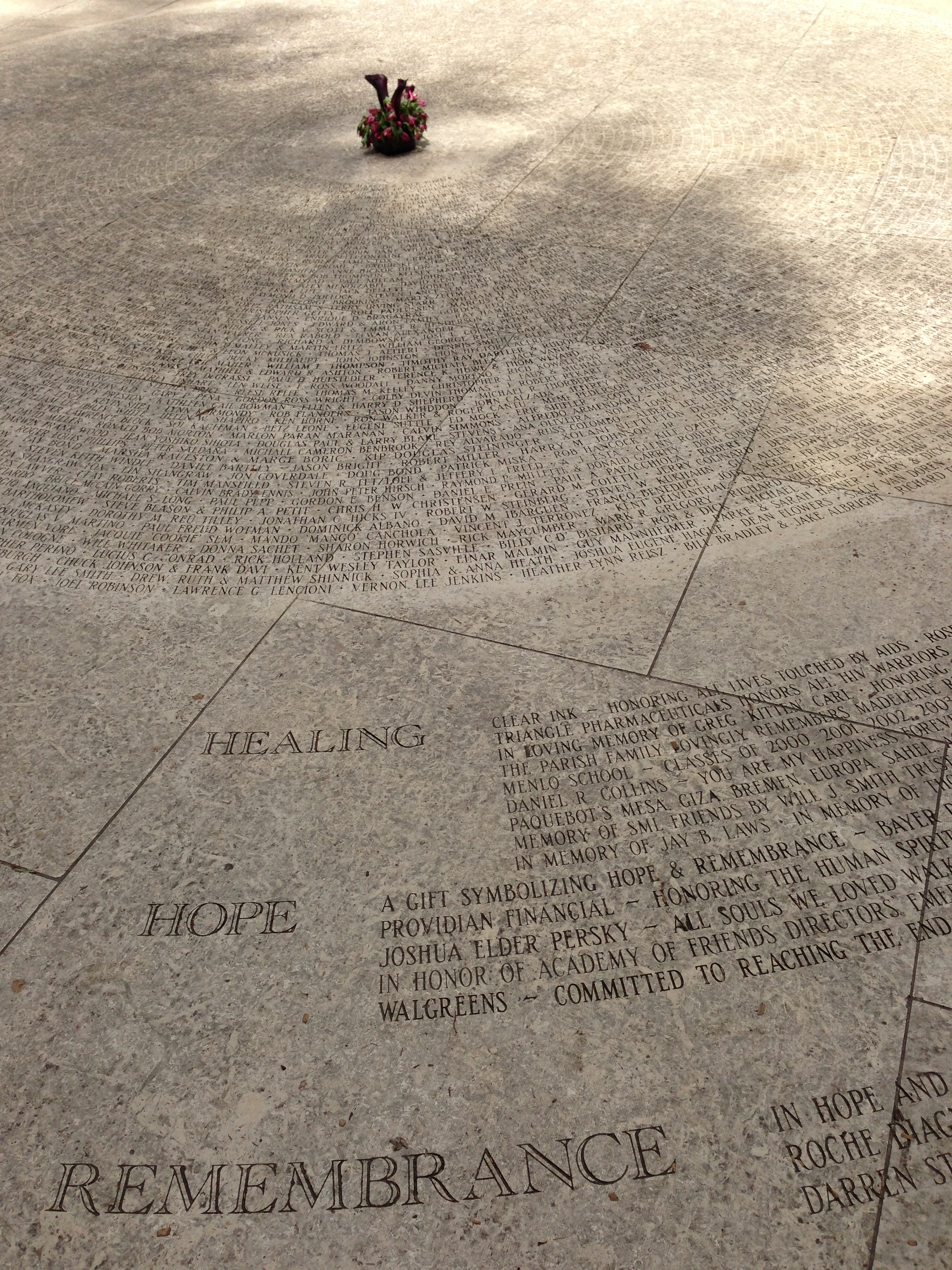
Circle of Friends

1996

- (February) Roll-out of the 'Circle of Friends' feature, a terrace of honor and memory, and place for names to be engraved into the floor of flagstone. New names will be added annually — inscribed before the Grove's World AIDS Day commemoration each December 1.

A later inscription expresses the 'Circle of Friends' spirit of place:

“Circle of Friends: Lives Touched By AIDS...Donors to the Grove...Those Who Have Died...Those Who Loved Them.”

- (April) NBC's Today Show spotlights the AIDS Memorial Grove in a segment by correspondent Dawn Frantangelo. It was filmed in January during the inscribing of her AIDS deceased brother's name for 'Circle of Friends' inclusion.
- The 'Dogwood Crescent', home of the 'Circle of Friends' terrace, is created.
- The 'Woodland Path' accessibility ramp from the 'South Portal' is built.
- The 'Meadow Overlook' is created at the 'West Portal', through the first major capital campaign gift, funded by the Richard and Rhoda Goldman Fund
- The 'Woodland Stream' is created over two work-days, by bucket brigades of volunteers handing stones from delivery pallets into the streambed.

==== National Memorial of the United States ====
- (October) U.S. Congress designates The AIDS Memorial Grove as an official National Memorial of the United States.

Legislation was written by Executive Director Kerry Enright, who worked with staff of Representative Nancy Pelosi and Senator Dianne Feinstein.

- (December) World AIDS Day; Dedication of the 'South Portal' feature, underwritten by Terry Watanabe of Omaha

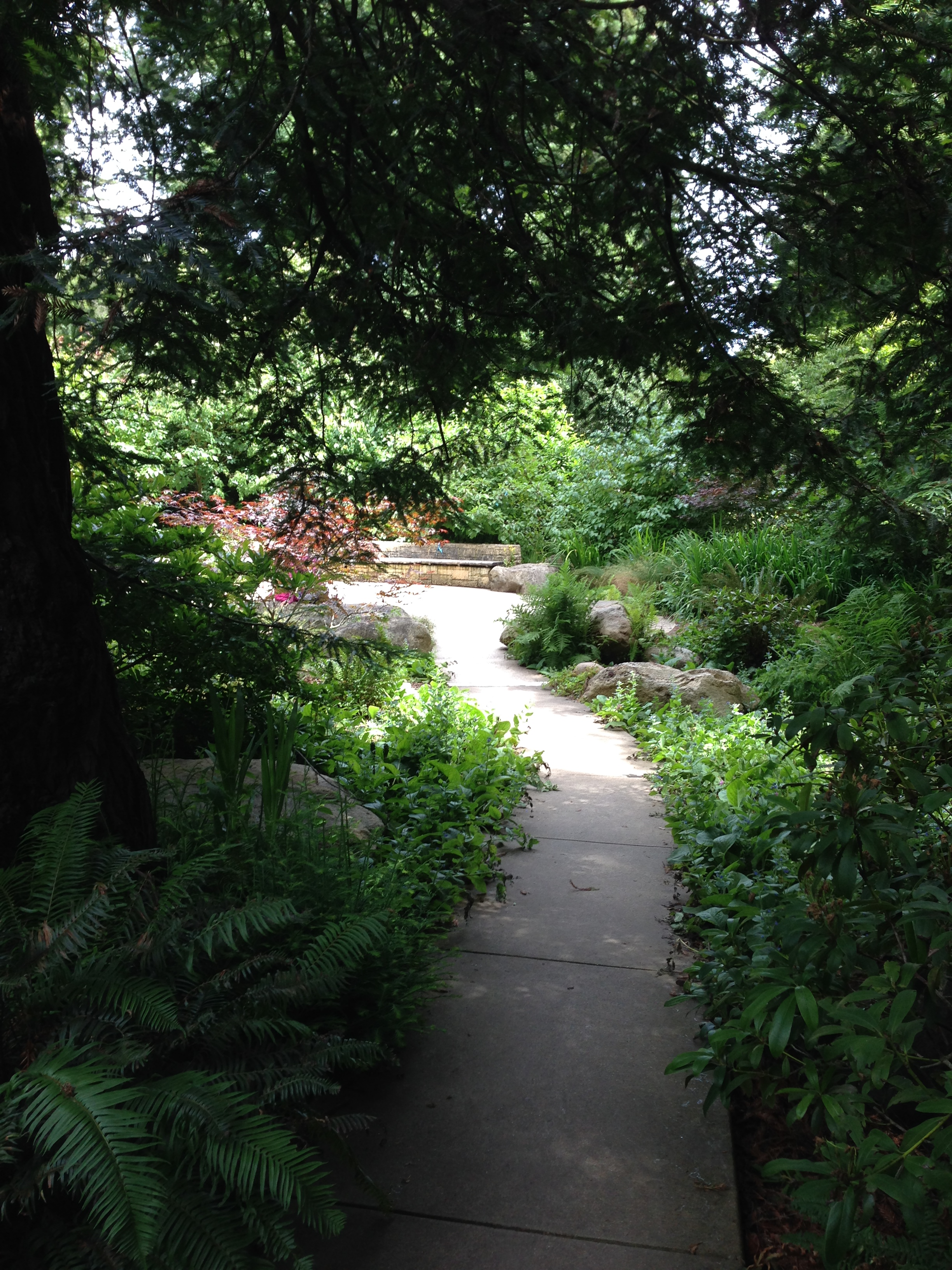
Path to the Circle of Friends

1997

- The 'Fern Grotto', a gathering place with the 'Circle of Peace' circular terrace, is created in the far western section of the Grove.

A poem by Thom Gunn is inscribed here:

"dedicated to all of the unidentified individuals who fell victim to AIDS."

1998

- (August) Garden Design magazine publishes the article “A Healing Landscape”, by Harriet Heyman with input from the Grove's founders and designers.

1998

- (December) At the fifth World AIDS Day, Irene Smith receives the first GROVE AWARD for her pioneering work in founding Service Through Touch.
- (December) First Lady Hillary Clinton visits the National AIDS Memorial Grove.

1999

- The National AIDS Memorial Grove receives the Silver Medal Award from the Rudy Bruner Award for Urban Excellence in the United States program.

The Bruner Award — “seeks to illuminate the complex process of urban place-making, so that it may be strengthened to better reflect the balance between form and use; opportunity and cost; preservation and change.”

- Tom Hanks records Public Service Announcement for The National AIDS Memorial Grove. Hanks won Academy Award for Best Actor (Oscar) for his portrayal of a gay man in the film “Philadelphia," who was suing his employer for AIDS based discrimination.
- 'Moonwalk Way', a new element, approved to control erosion. It is funded by the Moonwalk Foundation honoring Vivien Schneider and Silva Watson.
- (December) World AIDS Day; Grove Award honors Celi Adams RN, the founder of Home Care Companions.

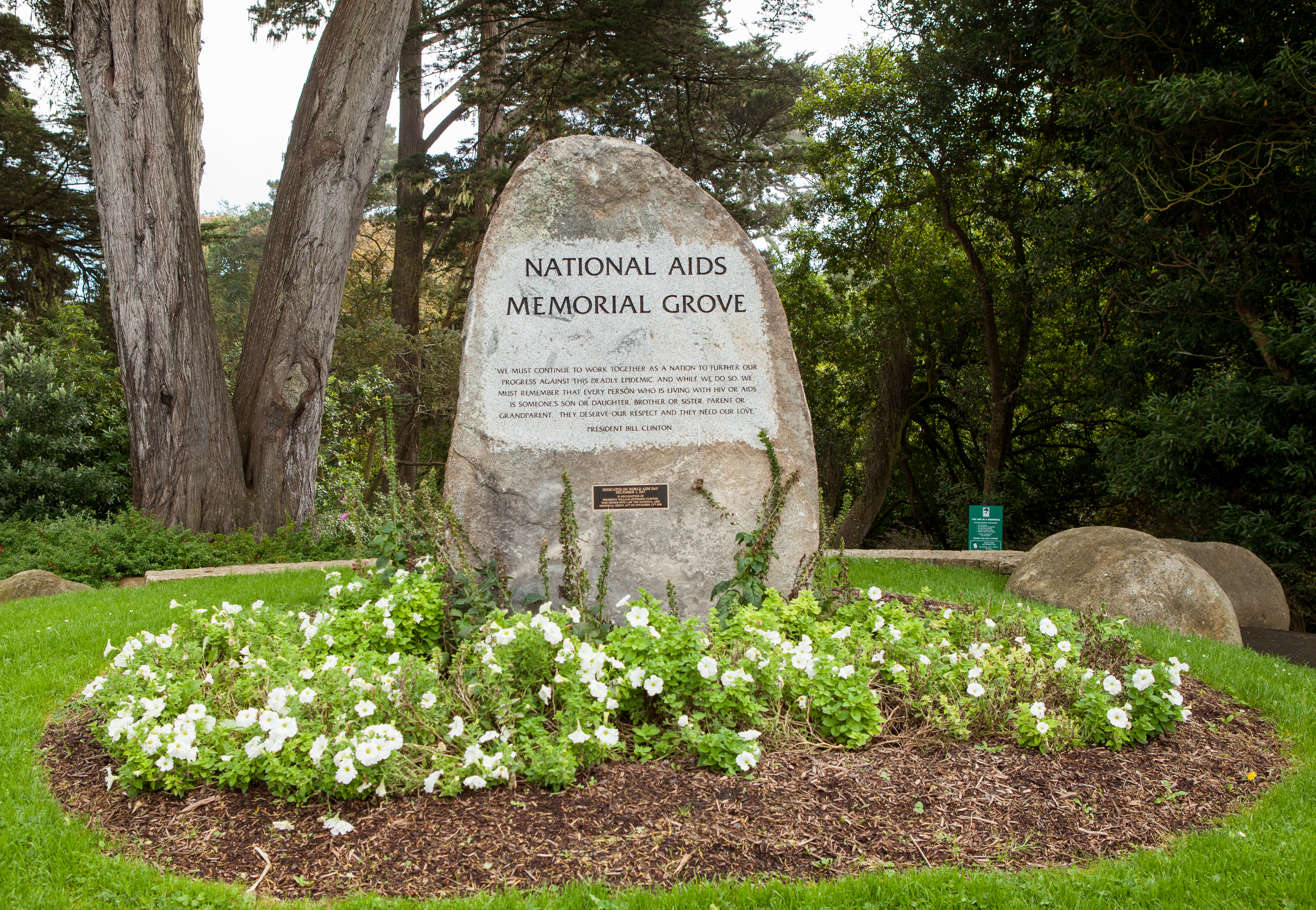
Stone marker featuring quote from President Bill Clinton, dedicated on World AIDS Day 2017

2000

- (March) Garden Design magazine publishes the article “A Healing Garden”, by Zazel Loven, with emphasis on the healing function of the AIDS Memorial Grove.
- (April) The 'Woodland Stream' feature is extended westward to the edge of 'The Meadow'.
- (May) First annual fundraiser in the Grove — “An Fair to Remember” gala and bazaar.
- (September) State of California appropriates $500,000 to the Grove (the only public monies in Grove history).
- (October) World Landmarks.com lists National AIDS Memorial Grove.
- (December) World AIDS Day observed with “All Our Communities Can Make a Difference” theme. Grove Award for Community Service to Hosea Turner, Shanti's Transportation Manager.

2001

- (May) Second Annual Fundraiser — “Oasis – a Shopping Safari”.
- (June) Grove commemorates 20 years of the AIDS pandemic.
- (December) World AIDS Day; Grove honors families at World AIDS Day Observance. Grove Award for Community Service to Jim Greenshields, Coming Home Hospice Chef.

2002

- The 'Western Portal' constructed, a gift of the Donald O Collins Foundation.
- (May) Third Annual Grove Fundraiser — “Shangri La, A Shoppers Paradise”.
- (May) Construction of 'Crossroads Circle', the final hardscape feature in the original 1991 design, is completed.
- (August) 'The Meadow' is reseeded.

2002

- The 'Belvedere Overlook' feature constructed, providing a view into the Grove, and a granite "Timeline of the Epidemic" sculpture.
- (October) Dedication Ceremony and picnic, honoring the completion of the improvements and features originally envisioned in the 1991 design by the founders of the AIDS Memorial Grove, and the establishment of the initial $1.5 million endowment fund.
- (December) World AIDS Day “Stigma and Discrimination”. Grove Award for Volunteer Service to F. Vic Galvan, longtime volunteer and Grove tour guide.

2003

- (April) Board votes to proceed with a Memorial Design Feature Competition. The idea is to add to the experience of visiting the Grove and to increase public awareness of this as the National Memorial to those lost to AIDS.
- World AIDS Day; Grove Award for Community Service to Paul Miller; and Award of Hope to Thomas J Coats, PhD

2004

- Initial money raised to hire Andy Abrahams Wilson to write a professional treatment for a documentary film about the Grove.
- (May) "Groove in the Grove" gala and concert event.

2005

- Memorial Design Feature Competition winner announced: “Living Memorial” by Janette Kim and Chloe Town,
- (December) World AIDS Day; Donor Appreciation Award to Donald O Collins; Community Service Award to Gert McMullin of the Names Project.

2006

- Open Eye Pictures creates initial trailer for “Forget Me Not” — a documentary film about the Grove.
- (September) "Mad Hatter’s Tea Party" 15th Anniversary Gala.
- (December) World AIDS Day; Grove Award honors Dr Abraham Verghese; and the McCormick family (owners of Magnani Chicken), honored for 13 years of contributions to Monthly Community Volunteer Workday lunches.

2007

- (December) World AIDS Day; Grove Award for Community Service honored Ruth Brinker, founder of Project Open Hand; Donor Appreciation Award to Brenda Wright Sr VP Wells Fargo.

2008

- (December) World AIDS Day; Coming Of Age with AIDS Grove Award for HIV/AIDS is given to Don Jacobs Grove, a workday volunteer; Donor Appreciation Award is given to Bill Clark and Alice Russell-Shapiro, founding board members.

2009

- (December) World AIDS Day; National Leadership Award is given to Dr. Stephen F Morin; Local Unsung Hero Award to Bishop Yvette Flunder, executive director of Ark of Refuge Inc.; First Annual Youth Scholarships awarded to student essay writers.

2010

- Work begins on the South Slope Rhododendron Restoration Project, with initial donations from Polo de Lorenzo.
- Words of Henry Wells inscribed above bench facing Circle of Peace.
- (November) First annual "Light In the Grove" gala event. Pat Christen, former director of San Francisco AIDS Foundation, is honored for her role in creating the Ryan White Care Act.
- (December) World AIDS Day; Local Unsung Hero award to Laura Thomas; National Leadership Award to Jeanne White Gindler and Ted Kennedy for producing the Ryan White Care Act and its 1990 Congressional passage.

2011

- Together the 30 year Anniversary of the AIDS pandemic, and 20 year Anniversary of the AIDS Memorial Grove, provide focus for remembering and planning throughout the year leading up to World AIDS Day on 12/01/2011.
- (December) World AIDS Day; the National AIDS Memorial Grove's "World AIDS Day Youth Scholarship Program" awards four 2011 World AIDS Day Youth Scholarship awards at the World AIDS Day ceremony.
- Planning and Fundraising begin for the restoration of the old Victorian Falls – a joint project with the San Francisco Public Utilities Commission in honor of Frances McCormick.

2012

- (November) "Light in the Grove 2012" gala event, planned for November 30 to honor the lifetime contributions of William D. Glenn and Prescott W. Hafner for their personal involvement, leadership and compassion to the many communities affected by the AIDS pandemic.

2017

- (September) The Hemophilia Memorial at the National AIDS Memorial Grove opened.

2019

- (November) The NAMES Project Foundation and House Speaker Nancy Pelosi announce that the AIDS Memorial Quilt will be on permanent display at the Grove starting in 2020.

2020

- (June) All 48,000 tiles of the AIDS Memorial Quilt go online.
- (December) The National AIDS Memorial honored Dr. Anthony Fauci and Dr. David Ho during the National AIDS Memorial's virtual World AIDS Day commemoration on Dec. 1, 2020.

== See also ==
- Art of the 1980s AIDS Crisis
- List of national memorials of the United States
- Index: Golden Gate Park Wikipedia articles
- New Orleans AIDS Memorial
