= UK AIDS Memorial Quilt =

Memorial quilt to British people afftected by AIDS

- UK AIDS Quilt, Turbine Hall, Tate Modern 2025
- Location: London, UK
- Type: Memorial
- Beginning date: 1989
- Dedicated to: Those effected by AIDS
- Website: aidsquiltuk.org

The UK AIDS Memorial Quilt is an ongoing memorial project that commemorates lives affected by AIDS in the United Kingdom.

== About ==
The UK AIDS quilt consists of 43 blocks, each made up of eight panels, and 23 individual panels that commemorate over 600 individuals. Each panel upon the quilt measures 6ft by 3ft, reflecting the size of a typical grave plot.

Notable individuals depicted on the quilt include Freddie Mercury, Keith Haring, John Lewis, Leigh Bowery, Roger Youd, Bruce Chatwin, Michael Sundin, Ian Charleson, and Denholm Elliott.

== History ==
At major charitable events in the UK blocks from the American quilt, known as the Names Project AIDS Memorial Quilt were first displayed in London in 1988 in the absence of a UK version of the quilt.

In 1989 quilt panels were beginning to be made in the UK with the creation of 'quilt workshops' organised by UK local and regional HIV/AIDS charities as a means to give family, friends and lovers a means to express their grief. Panels were then stitched into 12ft x 12ft blocks, often in community groups, although there are accounts of block stitching 'parties' to celebrate the lives of those being commemorated in blocks by stitching 8 individual panels together.

The quilt blocks were housed in Bournemouth, England before Scottish AIDS activist Alistair Hulme saw the NAMES Project AIDS Memorial Quilt on display in San Francisco in 1989. In 1990 Hulme, then national director of the newly formed NAMES Project (UK) offered to house the existing blocks in Edinburgh owing to space to "make it more viable" for the quilt to grow. Hulme also met the creator of the AIDS Memorial Quilt, Cleve Jones.

After the 1994 Hyde Park, Crusaid 'Walk for Life' held on Sunday 5 June the quilt went on display in Bristol on World AIDS Day before it was put into storage, where it stayed for 20 years. In 2013, Siobhán Lanigan (who had worked at the London Lighthouse centre for HIV treatment in 1992) and colleagues brought this to public attention, and seven HIV charities partnered to preserve it and accept new panels.

In 2013, the quilt was being stored in a cupboard at the George House Trust in Manchester and was deteriorating.

As of 2025, it is stored at Positive East in London. It requires some conservation work.

== Quilt Display 1989 - 1998 ==
As more individual quilt panels and blocks were completed, they were frequently put on public display across the UK. However, due to their significant size - a single block of eight panels measuring 12ft x 12ft, the number of pieces exhibited at any given time depended entirely on the venues available space.

=== 1988 ===
The earliest display of the NAMES Project AIDS Memorial Quilt was a section of the quilt from America in Hyde Park on World AIDS Day, 1 December 1988. The commemorative event was organised by the Terrence Higgins Trust and named 'The Launch for Life' that saw 1,000 balloons simultaneously released into the sky from London's Hyde Park, Edinburgh, Barcelona & Paris. The event was attended by actor Simon Callow, MP Chris Smith, then Labour Treasury Spokesman, AIDS workers and the Sylvia Young Childrens choir.

=== 1991 ===
In August 1991 an exhibition of the UK quilt, then consisting of 26 individual panels took place in Wandsworth, London.

=== 1992 ===
Between 29 June-6 July 1992, the quilt went on display at Bradford's Central Library, with an opening memorial ceremony taking place on Monday 29 June.

On Sunday 6 September 1992, national AIDS fundraiser Crusaid organised a Walk for Life event in Birmingham's Sutton Park, with food, entertainment, and a display of the UK quilt for the first time in Birmingham. HIV/AIDS charities in and around Birmingham were said to benefit from funds raised.

Between 20-22 November 1992, at the Herbert Art Gallery & Museum, Coventry, 24 panels were displayed.

For a week over World AIDS Day 1992, the largest exhibition of the UK Quilt consisting of 62 individual panels was held at the Grand Hotel, Birmingham.

=== 1993 ===
30 June - 3 July 1993, the UK quilt embarks on another national tour and goes on display for a second time in Bradford, at the Central Library.

The UK quilt toured the North East of England, 6-7 October 1993, the quilt is formed of 92 individual panels and goes on display at St. Michaels Church, Sunderland.

9-10 October the quilt is displayed at Newcastle Cathedral.

12-13 October 1993, the quilt, with Alistair Hulme in attendance goes on display inside Durham Cathedral.

15-16 October 1993 the quilt is displayed at St Mary's Centre, Middlesbrough. It was reported that as part of the tour new panels commemorating loved ones would be added to the quilt.

=== 1994 ===
On the 25-27 April 1994, the Cambridge AIDS Helpline bring the quilt to Cambridge University to help raise funds through donations to the Cambridge AIDS Helpline.

Sunday 5 June 1994, in Hyde Park, National AIDS fundraising charity Crusaid organise a sponsored 10km 'Walk for Life' which presented the UK quilt and reading of the names ceremony at the finish line in London's Hyde Park.

27-30 November 1994, Brewhouse Arts Centre host panels from the UK quilt in Burton, Staffordshire with local press highlighting the display of Freddie Mercury's panel made by the band Queen.

World AIDS Day 1994, the UK quilt now formed by 210 panels is displayed at the Council House, Bristol until 3 December 1994. Local newspaper Western Daily reported on 2 December 1994 "Among those looking at the quilt was Mike Healey - a 35-year-old Bristol man living with AIDS. He said "I love the Quilt, but I hate it as well because it brings home the true statistics".

=== 1995 ===
2-4 February 1995, the "giant patchwork quilt" goes on display at Leicester's City Rooms, Hotel Street.

=== 1998 ===
Every Wednesday during September 1998, Looking Well in Bentham, North Yorkshire host several blocks. North Yorkshire AIDS Action host the quilt blocks in what they dubbed the "most rural" location the UK AIDS Quilt had been displayed at that point in time.

== UK AIDS Quilt Partnership ==
Upon the re-discovery of the UK AIDS Quilt in a cupboard at George House Trust, Manchester in 2013 it was clear upon inspection that it was in desperate need of repair.

In 2014 a partnership was formed consisting of seven HIV support charities, The Food Chain, Positive East, Terrence Higgins Trust, Positively UK, Sahir House, Waverley Care & The George House Trust.

The purpose of the partnership is to conserve the quilt, place it on public display as often as possible whilst also trying to find a permanent home for the quilt to be stored and displayed. The partnership is also made up of a network of volunteers who conserve and repair the quilt, it's archive and volunteer at quilt displays.

== Quilt Display 2014 - Present ==
Since the formation of the UK AIDS Quilt partnership in 2014 sections of the quilt have been frequently on display throughout the UK.

=== 2016 ===
From late November through World AIDS Day several London locations host the quilt across various days including St. Paul's Cathedral, London with the display being backed by artist, writer and performer Grayson Perry. It was reported this was the first time in 20 years that a significant portion of the quilt had been on display. Several other venues simultaneously displayed sections of the quilt including, Guildhall Art Gallery, Brand Museum (formerly the AIDS Hospice London Lighthouse), Positive East, St. Anne's Church, Soho, All Hallows by the Tower and many others.

=== 2025 ===
From 12 to 16 June 2025, the quilt was displayed in its entirety at the Turbine Hall of the Tate Modern. This was the most significant display of the quilt as a whole since its display in Hyde Park in 1994. The writer Charlie Porter had written to the Tate asking them to display the quilt.

=== 2026 ===
Wakefield Exchange June 2026

The city of Wakefield was the first to host the entire UK Quilt outside of London between 4-7 June at the Wakefield Exchange, Art House Gallery, The Hepworth, Theatre Royal & Yorkshire Sculpture Park. The display also included the traditional reading of the names ceremony.

Glasgow Tramway, in a symbolic nod to where many of the quilt blocks were previously housed under Ally Van Tilo (formerly Alistair Hulme) leadership as national director of the NAMES Project (UK), the entire quilt was on display at the Glasgow Tramway from 12 September 2026 - 4 October 2026. The display was ceremonially opened with the reading of the names along with speech's from founder of the NAMES Project AIDS Memorial Quilt, Cleve Jones and Chair of the UK AIDS Memorial Quilt Partnership, Siobhán Lanigan.

== Other documentation ==
The 1995 documentary film There Is A Light That Never Goes Out was made about the creation of the quilt.

The British art historian Daniel Fountain has written about the Quilt in several publications.

In 2025 several panels of the quilt were subject to additional research on the podcast AIDS: The Lost Voices in a series titled 'Behind the Stitches'. Where HIV/AIDS activist and host William Hampson, who also lives with HIV/AIDS set out to learn more about the lives behind individual quilt panels where little was known about their full identity, often starting his research with only a forename.
