= Detention of Roger George Youd =

Roger George Youd (22 May 1956 – 16 December 1985) was the only person in the United Kingdom to be subject to a court order given under the Public Health (Control of Disease) Act 1984 preventing him from leaving hospital due to AIDS. This was the first time in Western Europe that such a court order had been issued.

== Life ==
Born in Flint, Wales, Youd left Buckley to study at Wolverhampton Polytechnic. He then moved to Manchester in 1978 and worked as a clerk at Edelson Furs, Ancoats during the day and as a nightclub barman and disc jockey in the evenings. Youd was diagnosed HIV positive in late August 1985 and on 4 September 1985 he was admitted to Monsall Hospital, Manchester where he died of malabsorption due to acquired immunodeficiency syndrome (AIDS) on 16 December 1985.

== Court case and appeal ==
On Saturday 14 September 1985, in a 5-minute hearing at Manchester Magistrates Court, an application for a court order under the Public Health (Control of Disease) Act 1984 was made in order to detain Youd in Monsall Hospital, as he had expressed a wish to return to his home in Levenshulme.

Application for detainment under section 38 of the 1984 Act requires the patient to be suffering from a notifiable disease, HIV/AIDS is not classified as a notifiable disease in the United Kingdom. However the Public Health (Infectious Diseases) Regulations 1985, which came into force in March 1985, extended some of the same powers to AIDS patients, until its revocation by the Public Health (Infectious Diseases) Regulations 1988.

The order was sought by Manchester's medical officer for environmental health, Dr Anna Elizabeth Jones. Dr Jones had previously been quoted in the Manchester Evening News on 26 January 1985: "Dr Elizabeth Jones, Manchester's medical officer for environmental health said a strong case could be made out for making AIDS a notifiable disease". Manchester's Environmental Services Committee was the body responsible for approving Dr Jones's application for the order. The chair of the committee did not have executive power. Councillor Keith Bradley was the chair of the committee. Bradley approved Dr Jones's request for application for the order without convening a meeting of the committee to pass a motion to approve the application.

Dr Jones sought the order upon request from Monsall Hospital consultant Dr Edward Dunbar. Dunbar later defended his actions in a television interview where he claimed Youd "was bleeding profusely from many orifices ... in danger of dying from the loss of a large quantity of blood, which would be lost in a projectile manner, and anybody in the near vicinity was likely to be sprayed with a large quantity of infected blood". Youd was suffering with rectal bleeding, which was a known symptom of both heterosexual and homosexual patients with advanced stages of AIDS. Dr Jones told the court Youd "was bleeding copiously and trying to discharge himself"; Dr Jones also told the court that Youd's release from hospital "would be most dangerous".

The application for the order to detain Youd was granted by magistrate Mr Thomas Jones, on the morning of the Saturday 14 September 1985. Youd's brother, sister-in-law and mother, were staying at a lodge within the hospital grounds. Youd and his family were only notified by Dr Dunbar that the detainment order had been obtained after it had been issued. Youd´s mother was unaware he was being treated for AIDS and only learnt about it due to press coverage of the court order.

On 24 September 1985, at Manchester Crown Court, sitting as Lord of Appeal in Ordinary Lord Justice Russell allowed the order to be withdrawn on appeal following arguments made by Youd's barrister, who had been appointed by the Terrence Higgins Trust to act as Youd's counsel. Manchester City Council did not oppose the appeal.

== Press coverage ==
The application for the order was made on the morning of Saturday 14 September 1985 in a 'closed court' with reporting restrictions applied. However, Youd's full name was leaked to the press to which was splashed across several Sunday tabloids to the annoyance of the UK's Chief Medical Officer, Donald Acheson. The magistrate then made his own statement to the press in which he claimed "It was dangerous for this man to be let free".

On the day of the application the detainment order made front page headlines in that days Manchester Evening News lunchtime 'Extra' edition followed by the evening 'Final' edition and was followed up in Sunday newspapers and, over the following week, newspapers throughout the UK reported his intention to appeal.

Youd was initially anonymously referred to as a 29-year-old man but his full identity was revealed in later press coverage. As a result of the publicity the DHSS prepared Youd a new identity, his identity would have been changed to Stephen Williams.

News of Youd's detainment also appeared in newspapers across the United States.

On the 19 October 1985, the British Medical Journal published an article by their legal correspondent in regard to section 38 of the 1984 Act being applied to Youd and HIV/AIDS.

== Impact and legacy ==
Manchester Gay Council & Manchester Gay Centre representatives voiced anger that the case had not been heard in private and that the media had created "mass public hysteria" - John Brown, secretary of Manchester's Gay Centre said that people with HIV would avoid hospital "if they have to endure this sort of indignity". Councillor Graham Stringer, leader of Manchester City Council said: "We intend to complain that this hearing should not have been heard in public ... It will make it more difficult in future for people who suspect they have AIDS to come forward for treatment. They will be afraid of being identified and they will fear that they will be told to remain in hospital. The City Council now plan to draw up a policy statement covering all aspects of AIDS. One of the main concerns is that, when any future action is taken which restricts the movement of a patient the privacy and all other civil liberties of the patient are respected."

In October 1985 gay groups from all over Britain gathered to protest at Manchester Town Hall asking for Labour councillors to admit "we were wrong".

Nick Harris of Manchester City Council said in a television interview that was aired by Thames Television on 7 November 1985: "we believe that it shouldn't be necessary to use the legislation in future".

== In popular culture ==
In the Channel 4 drama It's a Sin, Youd's successful appeal to being detained under the 1984 Act is referred to in scenes where a character is forcibly detained and isolated in hospital.

On the 40th Anniversary of Youd's death, 16th December 2025, William Hampson, host of the podcast AIDS: The Lost Voices published an episode dedicated to Youd titled 'Remembering Roger Youd'. In the episode Hampson spoke with Youd's brother along with friends and activists who gave greater insight into the academic and fun loving man Youd was. The episode was in addition to an earlier 2024 episode where he reviewed press coverage of Youd's court case gathering newspaper articles and examining the roles of the local authority, medical and legal professionals involved.

== Call for an apology ==
In December 2025 HIV/AIDS activist and podcast host of 'AIDS: The Lost Voices - Remembering Roger Youd' William Hampson wrote to Manchester City Council calling upon them to posthumously apologise to Roger Youd, and the surviving Youd family.

This was followed up by Manchester Evening News who on the 9 August 2026 acknowledged the language in their own reporting on the detainment order in 1985. Manchester Evening News editor, Sarah Lester gave the following apology: "The Manchester Evening News was also part of the story we are telling today. Our archive contains coverage of Roger’s detention that used language and framing that makes deeply uncomfortable reading now.

"We recognise that our reporting contributed to the stigma and distress experienced by Roger and his family and many others in the gay community. We are sorry for that."

In the same article a Manchester City Council spokesperson stated: “Mr Youd's treatment was unacceptable and is something we profoundly regret. We acknowledge the distress he and his family went through and we would be happy to meet with family members should they wish to discuss the case."

In response Human Rights campaigner Peter Tatchell told Manchester Evening News "The expression of 'regret' by Manchester City Council is not enough. It should make a full apology, and so should the Manchester region of the NHS."

Terrence Higgins Trust also responded to the council's lack of apology by telling Manchester Evening News that they organised Youd's counsel in 1985 and were victorious in having the order rescinded upon appeal. They also told the Manchester Evening News they supported the characterisation of Hampson's call for an apology.

Call for apology, Manchester Pride 2026

In an effort raise awareness of the call for an apology Hampson set up an online petition and further, walked with Roger Youd's brother Carlton in the Manchester Village Pride Parade on Saturday 29 August 2026. Hampson recalls the pair were positioned at the front of the parade in front of both Manchester City Council and Mayor of Greater Manchester Bev Craig. The pair wore t-shirts and carried placards with the slogan "Manchester Council Owes Roger Youd an Apology!" This resulted in the pair being approached by Bev Craig and the leader of Manchester City Council Garry Bridges. Hampson confirmed that the conversation was encouraging and an apology seemed likely once they spoke with Roger's brother Carlton Youd who was the hospitals point of contact regarding his brothers care in 1985

== Memorials ==
=== UK AIDS Memorial Quilt ===
AIDS Quilt 47 displayed at Kimpton Clocktower

In 2025 HIV/AIDS activist made an entirely new UK AIDS Memorial Quilt block measuring 12ft x 12ft which features eight individual 3ft x 6ft panels stitched together to memorialise 43 individuals lost to HIV/AIDS. Hampson dedicated a panel to Roger Youd and the completed quilt was added to the UK AIDS Memorial Quilt collection and is known as 'Quilt Block 47' on World AIDS Day 2025.

At the first display of quilt block 47 alongside the entire UK AIDS Memorial Quilt in June 2026 in the city of Wakefield, Hampson took part in the reading of the names ceremony where all the names upon the UK AIDS Memorial quilt were read aloud. Hampson read the names memorialised upon quilt block 47 which he created.

Youd was the fourth name Hampson read before he deviated from his list of names to state: "Manchester City Council owes Roger and the Youd family a sincere apology for Roger's unlawful hospital detention in September 1985 - rescinded upon appeal, protests, national and international outrage. This injustice has gone unacknowledged for over 40 years, Manchester City Council, please, do what is right."

Visitors view Roger Youd display Kimpton Clocktower

A week over Manchester Village Pride 2026 Hampson took the UK AIDS Memorial Quilt block 47 to Manchester which was displayed at the Kimpton Clocktower hotel between 24 August 2026 - 31 August 2026.

The quilt was accompanied with an intimate exhibition jointly collaborated by Hampson and the Youd family to show there was more to Roger's life than the sensational headlines around the hospital detainment order of 1985.

The exhibition included private family photographs and a letter Roger wrote to his niece from his hospital bed the day after the detainment order of 14 September 1985.

=== Beacon of Hope Plaques ===
Beacon of Hope, Sackville Gardens, Manchester, England

In the year's running up to 2026 Roger's friend Antony Eaves championed the George House Trust to honor his friend Youd on the city's Beacon of Hope AIDS memorial located in Sackville Gardens, Manchester.

On the 3 July 2026 the George House Trust installed a stainless steel 2025 timeline plaque on the Beacon of Hope memorial which highlighted that 2025 marked 40 years since Youd's hospital detainment in 1985. The plaque reads: "The year also marked 40 years since Roger Youd was detained at Monsall Hospital as a 'public health risk' - a story that continues to highlight the enduring impact of HIV stigma".

Beacon of Hope, Sackville Gardens, Manchester, England

In addition, presented by the George House Trust and championed by Youd's friend Antony Eaves, a memorial plaque was unveiled on the 27 August 2026 with a colour photograph of Roger Youd which sits beneath the timeline plaque on the Beacon of Hope. The plaque reads: "Roger George Youd. 22 May 1956 - 16 December 1985. Another soul of the generation lost to AIDS. DJ in Manchester's Gay Clubs. In 1985 Roger was detained against his will in Monsall Hospital as a 'public health risk'. Roger's experience demonstrates the impact of attaching stigma to HIV. Disco balls sparkled and span to his mixes, reflections of his life dance on".

The plaques were unveiled in time for the Manchester Village Pride candlelight vigil held in Sackville Gardens on Monday 31 August 2026 where Roger's name and photograph concluded both the video montage of names and brought the vigil to a close.
