= Elizabeth Catlett =

American artist and sculptor (1915–2012)

- Catlett in 1986
- Born: Alice Elizabeth Catlett; April 15, 1915; Washington, D.C., US
- Died: April 2, 2012 (aged 96); Cuernavaca, Mexico
- Other names: Elizabeth Catlett Mora; Elizabeth Catlett de Mora
- Education: School of the Art Institute of Chicago, South Side Community Art Center; Howard University, University of Iowa
- Occupations: Sculptor, art teacher, graphic artist
- Employers: Taller de Gráfica Popular, Faculty of Arts and Design
- Works: Students Aspire
- Spouse(s): Charles Wilbert White (m. 1941–1946; divorced); Francisco Mora (painter) (m. 1947–2002; his death)
- Children: 3, including Juan Mora Catlett
- Website: www.elizabethcatlettart.com

Elizabeth Catlett, born as Alice Elizabeth Catlett, also known as Elizabeth Catlett Mora (April 15, 1915 – April 2, 2012) was an American and Mexican sculptor and graphic artist best known for her depictions of the Black-American experience in the 20th century, which often focused on the female experience. She was born and raised in Washington, D.C., to parents working in education, and was the grandchild of formerly enslaved people. It was difficult for a black woman then to pursue a career as a working artist. Catlett devoted much of her career to teaching. However, a fellowship awarded to her in 1946 allowed her to travel to Mexico City, where she settled and worked with the Taller de Gráfica Popular for twenty years and became head of the sculpture department for the Escuela Nacional de Artes Plásticas. In the 1950s, her main means of artistic expression shifted from print to sculpture, though she never gave up the former.

Her work is a mixture of abstract and figurative in the Modernist tradition, with influence from African and Mexican art traditions. Catlett's work can be described as social realism because of her dedication to the issues and experiences of African Americans. According to the artist, the primary purpose of her work is to convey social messages rather than pure aesthetics. Her work is heavily studied by art students who want to depict race, gender, and class issues. During her lifetime, Catlett received many awards and recognitions, including membership in the Salón de la Plástica Mexicana, the Art Institute of Chicago Legends and Legacy Award, honorary doctorates from Pace University and Carnegie Mellon, and the International Sculpture Center's Lifetime Achievement Award in contemporary sculpture.

== Early life ==
Catlett was born and raised in Washington, D.C. Both of her parents were the children of formerly enslaved people; her grandmother told her stories about the capture of their people in Africa and the hardships of plantation life. Catlett was the youngest of three children. Her parents worked in education; her mother was an attendance officer; her father taught math at Tuskegee University, then the D.C. public school system. Her father died before she was born, leaving her mother to hold several jobs to support the household.

Catlett's interest in art began early. As a child, she became fascinated by a wood carving of a bird that her father made. In high school, she studied art with a descendant of Frederick Douglass, Haley Douglass.

== Education ==
Catlett completed her undergraduate studies at Howard University, graduating cum laude, although it was not her first choice. She was also admitted into the Carnegie Institute of Technology but was refused admission when the school discovered she was black. However, in 2007, Tyra Butler, board member of the August Wilson Center for African American Culture in Pittsburgh, Pennsylvania, invited E&S Gallery to do an exhibition featuring the art of prominent African-American artists in partnership with the August Wilson Center. Cathy Shannon, Chief Curator with E&S Gallery was giving a talk to a youth group in conjunction with the exhibition and recounted Catlett's tie to Pittsburgh because of this injustice. A Carnegie Mellon University administrator, Robbie Baker Kosak, attended as a guest of Tyra Butler and heard the story for the first time. The Dean of the College of Fine Arts, Hilary Robinson, also saw an account of the refusal in an exhibition of Black artists in downtown Pittsburgh. They both told the story to the school's president, Jared Leigh Cohon, who was also unaware and deeply appalled that such a thing had happened. In 2008, Ms. Butler asked E&S to inform Mrs. Catlett that President Cohon wanted to present Catlett with an honorary doctorate and a solo exhibition. E&S Gallery presented a one-woman show of her art at the Miller Gallery at Carnegie Mellon University. Tyra Butler, Stephanie and Michael Jasper, Claudette Lewis, and Yvonne Cook published and produced a catalog of Catlett's work, introduced by Dean Robinson, in conjunction with the exhibition.

At Howard University, Catlett's professors included artist Lois Mailou Jones and philosopher Alain Locke. She also came to know artist James Herring and future art historian James A. Porter. Her tuition was paid for by her mother's savings and scholarships that the artist earned, and she graduated with honors in 1937. At the time, the idea of a career as an artist was far-fetched for a black woman, so she completed her undergraduate studies intending to be a teacher. After graduation, she moved to her mother's hometown of Durham, North Carolina, to teach art at Hillside High School.

Catlett became interested in the work of American painter Grant Wood, so she entered the graduate program where he taught at the University of Iowa. There, she studied drawing and painting with Wood, as well as sculpture with Harry Edward Stinson. Wood advised her to depict images of what she knew best, so Catlett began sculpting images of African-American women and children. However, despite being accepted to the school, she was not permitted to stay in the dormitories; therefore, she rented a room off-campus. One of her roommates was future novelist and poet Margaret Walker. Catlett graduated in 1940, one of three to earn the first Master in Fine Arts from the university, and the first African-American woman to receive the degree.

After Iowa, Catlett moved to New Orleans to work at Dillard University, spending the summer breaks in Chicago. During her summers, she studied ceramics at the School of the Art Institute of Chicago and lithography at the South Side Community Art Center. In Chicago, she also met her first husband, artist Charles Wilbert White. The couple married in 1941. In 1942, the couple moved to New York, where Catlett taught adult education classes at the George Washington Carver School in Harlem. She also studied lithography at the Art Students League of New York; she received private instruction from Russian sculptor Ossip Zadkine, who urged her to add abstract elements to her figurative work. During her time in New York, she met intellectuals and artists such as Gwendolyn Bennett, W. E. B. Dubois, Ralph Ellison, Langston Hughes, Jacob Lawrence, Aaron Douglas, and Paul Robeson.

In 1946, Catlett received a Rosenwald Fund Fellowship to travel with her husband to Mexico and study. She accepted the grant partly because American art was trending toward the abstract while she was interested in art related to social themes. Shortly after moving to Mexico that same year, Catlett divorced White. In 1947, Catlett entered the Taller de Gráfica Popular, a workshop dedicated to prints promoting leftist social causes and education. There, she met printmaker and muralist Francisco Mora, whom she married later that same year. The couple had three children, all of whom developed careers in the arts: Francisco Mora Catlett in jazz music, Juan Mora Catlett in filmmaking, and David Mora Catlett in the visual arts. The last worked as his mother's assistant, performing the more labor-intensive aspects of sculpting when she was no longer able. In 1948, she entered the Escuela Nacional de Pintura, Escultura y Grabado "La Esmeralda" to study wood sculpture with José L. Ruíz and ceramic sculpture with Francisco Zúñiga. During this time in Mexico, she became more serious about her art and more dedicated to the work it demanded. She also met Diego Rivera, Frida Kahlo, and David Alfaro Siqueiros.

In 2006, Kathleen Edwards, the curator of European and American art for the University of Iowa Museum of Art (UIMA), visited Catlett in Cuernavaca, Mexico, and purchased a group of 27 prints. Catlett donated this money to the University of Iowa Foundation to fund the Elizabeth Catlett Mora Scholarship Fund, which supports African-American and Latino students studying printmaking. Elizabeth Catlett Residence Hall on the University of Iowa campus is named in her honor.

== Activism ==
Catlett worked with the Taller de Gráfica Popular (TGP) from 1946 until 1966. However, because some of the members were also Communist party members, and because of her activism regarding a railroad strike in Mexico City leading to an arrest in 1949, Catlett came under surveillance by the United States Embassy. Eventually, she was barred from entering the United States and declared an "undesirable alien". She was unable to return home to visit her ill mother before she died. In 1962, Catlett renounced her American citizenship and became a Mexican citizen.

In 1971, after a letter-writing campaign to the U.S. State Department by colleagues and friends, she was issued a special permit to attend an exhibition of her work at the Studio Museum in Harlem.

== Later years ==
After retiring from her teaching position at the Escuela Nacional de Artes Plásticas, Catlett moved to the city of Cuernavaca, Morelos, in 1975. In 1983, she and Mora purchased an apartment in Battery Park City, New York. The couple spent part of the year together from 1983 until Mora died in 2002. Catlett regained her American citizenship in 2002.

Catlett remained an active artist until her death. The artist died peacefully in her sleep at her studio home in Cuernavaca on April 2, 2012, at the age of 96. She was survived by her three sons, 10 grandchildren, and six great-grandchildren.

== Career ==
Sharecropper, 1952 or 1957

Very early in her career, Catlett accepted a Public Works of Art Project assignment with the federal government for unemployed artists during the 1930s. However, she was fired for lack of initiative, likely due to immaturity. The experience gave her exposure to the socially-themed work of Diego Rivera and Miguel Covarrubias.

Much of her career was spent teaching, as her original intention was to be an art teacher. After receiving her undergraduate degree, her first teaching position was in the Durham, North Carolina, school system. She taught art at Hillside High School. However, she became very dissatisfied with the position because black teachers were paid less. Along with Thurgood Marshall, she participated in an unsuccessful campaign to gain equal pay. After graduate school, she accepted a position at Dillard University in New Orleans in the 1940s. There, she arranged a special trip to the Delgado Museum of Art to see the Picasso exhibit. As the museum was closed to black people at the time, the group went on a day it was closed to the public. She eventually chaired the art department at Dillard. Her next teaching position was with the George Washington Carver School, a community alternative school in Harlem, where she taught art and other cultural subjects to workers enrolled in night classes. Her last major teaching position was with the Escuela Nacional de Artes Plásticas (now known as the Faculty of Arts and Design) at the National Autonomous University of Mexico (UNAM), starting in 1958, where she was the first female professor of sculpture. One year later, she was appointed the head of the sculpture department despite protests that she was a woman and a foreigner. She remained with the school until her retirement in 1975.

When she moved to Mexico, Catlett's first work as an artist was with the Taller de Gráfica Popular (TGP), a famous workshop in Mexico City dedicated to graphic arts promoting leftist political causes, social issues, and education. At the TGP, she and other artists created a series of linoleum cuts featuring prominent black figures, as well as posters, leaflets, illustrations for textbooks, and materials to promote literacy in Mexico. Sharecropper, one of the linoleum cuts made at the TGP, is possibly her most famous work and is an excellent example of Catlett's bold visual style due to both the crisp black lines and rich brown and green inks of the drawing, and the halo of the hat brim and the upward looking angle of the composition making the figure monumental, or someone to be venerated, despite the poverty evidenced by the safety pin holding together the cloak. Catlett's immersion into the TGP was crucial for her appreciation and comprehension of the signification of "mestizaje", a blending of Indigenous, Spanish and African antecedents in Mexico, which was a parallel reality to African-American experiences. She remained with the workshop for twenty years, leaving in 1966. Her posters of Harriet Tubman, Angela Davis, Malcolm X and other figures were widely distributed.

Although she had an individual exhibition of her work in 1948 in Washington, D.C., her work did not begin to be shown regularly until the 1960s and 1970s, almost entirely in the United States, where it drew interest because of social movements such as the Black Arts Movement and feminism. While many of these exhibitions were collective, Catlett had more than fifty individual exhibitions of her work during her lifetime. The locations of other important individual exhibitions include the Escuela Nacional de Arte Pláticas of UNAM in 1962, the Museo de Arte Moderno in 1970, Los Angeles in 1971, the Studio Museum in Harlem in 1971, Washington, D.C. in 1972, Howard University in 1972, the Los Angeles County Museum of Art in 1976, the Miller Gallery at Carnegie Mellon University in 2008, and the 2011 individual show at the Bronx Museum. The last of her exhibitions that Catlett attended was in May 2009 at the University of Louisville's Cressman Center, organized by E&S Gallery. From 1993 to 2009, her work was regularly on display at the June Kelly Gallery. In July 2020, while closed to the public during the COVID-19 pandemic, the Philadelphia Museum of Art featured Catlett's work in an online exhibit.

The Legacy Museum, which opened on April 26, 2018, displays and dramatizes the history of slavery and racism in America and features artwork by Catlett and others. In 2023/2024, the Museum for Modern Art in Frankfurt showed the first comprehensive exhibition of Elizabeth Catlett's work.

== Awards and recognition ==
During her lifetime, Catlett received numerous awards and recognitions. These include First Prize at the 1940 American Negro Exposition in Chicago, induction into the Salón de la Plástica Mexicana in 1956, the Distinguished Alumni Award from the University of Iowa in 1996, a 1998 50-year traveling retrospective of her work sponsored by the Newberger Museum of Art at Purchase College, an NAACP Image Award in 2009, and a joint tribute after her death held by the Salón de la Plástica Mexicana and the Instituto Politécnico Nacional in 2013.

Other honors include an award from the Women's Caucus for Art, the Art Institute of Chicago Legends and Legacy Award, Elizabeth Catlett Week in Berkeley, California, Elizabeth Catlett Day in Cleveland, Ohio, honorary citizenship of New Orleans, honorary doctorates from Pace University and Carnegie Mellon, and the International Sculpture Center's Lifetime Achievement Award in contemporary sculpture. The Taller de Gráfica Popular won an international peace prize partly because of Catlett's achievements there. She received a Candace Award from the National Coalition of 100 Black Women in 1991. By the end of her career, her works, especially her sculptures, sold for tens of thousands of dollars.

She was the subject of an episode of the BBC Radio 4 series An Alternative History of Art, presented by Naomi Beckwith and broadcast on March 6, 2018. The Philadelphia Museum of Art featured Catlett in an online exhibition.

Carnegie Mellon University, the school that denied her entrance in 1931 based on her race, went on to bestow her with an Honorary Doctorate of Fine Arts degree in 2008.

Catlett delivered the 1995–96 Annual Sojourner Truth Lecture (first established in 1983, at Pitzer College.

Built in 2017, the University of Iowa's Catlett Residence Hall is named after her, as one of the first three individuals and the first Black woman to graduate with an MFA from there.

From September 13, 2024, to January 19, 2025, the Brooklyn Museum hosted a retrospective "Elizabeth Catlett: A Black Revolutionary Artist and All That It Implies" of her works. The show (retitled "Elizabeth Catlett: A Black Revolutionary Artist") was at the National Gallery of Art in March 9-July 6, 2025. The show travelled to the Art Institute of Chicago (as "Elizabeth Catlett: A Black Revolutionary Artist and All That It Implies" August 30, 2025-January 4, 2026. The catalog "Elizabeth Catlett: A Black Revolutionary Artist and All That It Implies" edited by Dalila Scruggs, accompanies the exhibit.

== Legacy ==
In 2017, Catlett's alma mater, the University of Iowa, opened a new residence hall bearing her name.

== Artistry ==
Reclining Female Nude (1955) in the exhibition Afro-Atlantic Histories at the National Gallery of Art in 2022

Catlett is recognized primarily for sculpting and print work. Her sculptures are known for being provocative, but her prints are more widely recognized, mostly because of her work with the Taller de Gráfica Popular. Although she never left printmaking, starting in the 1950s, she shifted primarily to sculpture. Her print work consisted mainly of woodcuts and linocuts, while her sculptures were composed of a variety of materials, such as clay, cedar, mahogany, eucalyptus, marble, limestone, onyx, bronze, and Mexican stone (cantera). She often recreated the same piece in several different media. Sculptures ranged in size and scope from small wood figures inches high to others several feet tall to monumental works for public squares and gardens. This latter category includes a 10.5-foot sculpture of Louis Armstrong in New Orleans and a 7.5-foot work depicting Sojourner Truth in Sacramento.

Much of her work is realistic and highly stylized two- or three-dimensional figures, applying the Modernist principles (such as organic abstraction to create a simplified iconography to display human emotions) of Henry Moore, Constantin Brâncuși and Ossip Zadkine to popular and easily recognized imagery. Other major influences include African and pre-Hispanic Mexican art traditions. Her works do not explore individual personalities, not even those of historical figures; instead, they convey abstract and generalized ideas and feelings. Her imagery arises from a scrupulously honest dialogue with herself on her life and perceptions, and between herself and "the other", that is, contemporary society's beliefs and practices of racism, classism and sexism. Many young artists study her work as a model for themes relating to gender, race, and class, but she is relatively unknown to the general public.

Her work revolved around social injustice, the human condition, historical figures, women, and the relationship between mother and child. These themes were explicitly related to the African-American experience in the 20th century with some influence from Mexican reality. This focus began while she was at the University of Iowa, where she was encouraged to depict what she knew best. Her thesis was the sculpture Mother and Child (1939), which won first prize at the American Negro Exposition in Chicago in 1940.

Mother and Child (1939)

Her subjects range from sensitive maternal images to confrontational symbols of Black Power, and portraits of Martin Luther King Jr., Malcolm X, Harriet Tubman, Rosa Parks, and writer Phillis Wheatley, as she believed that art could play a role in the construction of transnational and ethnic identity. Her best-known works depict black women as strong and maternal. The women are voluptuous, with broad hips and shoulders, in positions of power and confidence, often with torsos thrust forward to show attitude. Faces tend to be mask-like, generally upturned. Mother and Child (1939) shows a young woman with very short hair and features similar to that of a Gabon mask. A late work Bather (2009), has a similar subject flexing her triceps. Her linocut series The Black Woman Speaks is among the first graphic series in Western art to depict the image of the American black woman as a heroic and complex human being. Her work was influenced by the Harlem Renaissance movement and the Chicago Black Renaissance in the 1940s and reinforced in the 1960s and 1970s with the influence of the Black Power, Black Arts Movement and feminism. With artists like Lois Jones, she helped to create what critic Freida Tesfagiorgis called an "Afrofemcentrist" analytic.

The Taller de Gráfica Popular pushed her to adapt her work to reach the broadest possible audience, which generally meant balancing abstraction with figurative images. She stated of her time at the TGP: "I learned how you use your art for the service of people, struggling people, to whom only realism is meaningful."

Critic Michasel Brenson noted the "fluid, sensual surfaces" of her sculptures, which he said "seem to welcome not just the embrace of light but also the caress of the viewer's hand". Ken Johnson said that Ms. Catlett "gives wood and stone a melting, almost erotic luminosity". But he also criticized the iconography as "generic and clichéd".

However, Catlett was more concerned with the social messages of her work than with pure aesthetics. "I have always wanted my art to service my people – to reflect us, to relate to us, to stimulate us, to make us aware of our potential." She was a feminist and an activist before these movements took shape, pursuing a career in art despite segregation and the lack of female role models. "I don't think art can change things," Catlett said: "I think writing can do more. But art can prepare people for change, it can be educational and persuasive in people's thinking."

Catlett also acknowledged her artistic contributions as influencing younger black women. She relayed that being a black woman sculptor "before was unthinkable. ... There were very few black women sculptors – maybe five or six – and they all have very tough circumstances to overcome. You can be black, a woman, a sculptor, a print-maker, a teacher, a mother, a grandmother, and keep a house. It takes a lot of doing, but you can do it. All you have to do is decide to do it."

Catlett's The Negro Woman, dated 1946–1947, is a series of 15 linoleum cuts highlighting the experience of discrimination and racism that African-American women were facing at the time. This series also illustrated the strength and heroism of these women, including the historically prominent Harriet Tubman and Phillis Wheatley.

== Artist statements ==
No other field is closed to those who are not white and male as is the visual arts. After I decided to be an artist, the first thing I had to believe was that I, a black woman, could penetrate the art scene, and that, further, I could do so without sacrificing one iota of my blackness or my femaleness or my humanity.

— Elizabeth Catlett, 1973

"Art for me must develop from a necessity within my people. It must answer a question, or wake somebody up, or give a shove in the right direction — our liberation."

== Works ==
This is a list of Catlett's selected works.

- Students Aspire (1977), Howard University campus, 2300 6th Street NW, Washington, D.C.
- For My People portfolio (published 1992), by Limited Editions Club, New York
- Ralph Ellison Memorial (2002), 150th Street and Riverside Drive, Manhattan, New York
- Reclining Female Nude (1955), National Gallery of Art, Washington, D.C.
- Torso (1985), is a carving in mahogany modeled after another of Catlett's pieces, Pensive (b. 1946) a bronze sculpture. The mahogany carving is in the York College, CUNY Fine Art Collection (dimensions: 35' H x 19' W x 16' D). The exaggerated arms and breasts are prominent features of this piece. The crossed arms are broad, with simple geometric shapes and ripples to indicate a shirt with rolled-up sleeves and a gentle ridge along the neck. The hands are carved larger than what would be in proportion to the torso. The figure's eyes are painted with a calm yet steady gaze that signifies confidence. Catlett evokes a strong, working-class black woman like the other pieces she created to portray women's empowerment through expressive poses. Catlett favored materials such as cedar and mahogany because these materials naturally depict brown skin.
