= Daniel Fountain =

British academic

- Known for: Queer contemporary art and craft

Academic background
- Education: Aberystwyth University; King's College London; Loughborough University
- Thesis: All that glitters is gold: queering waste through campy craft (2021)
- Doctoral advisor: Hilary Robinson

Academic work
- Institutions: Nottingham Trent University; Loughborough University; Manchester Metropolitan University; University of Exeter
- Main interests: Queer visual culture, identity, and materiality.
- Website: www.danielfountain.com

Daniel Fountain (born 1994) is a British artist, curator and writer. Fountain is associate professor at the University of Exeter, UK.

An expert of LGBTQ+ art history and visual culture, Fountain has published numerous books, journal articles and catalogue essays that address feminism, the body, sexuality, and gender. Their recent publications have particularly explored the role of craft in contemporary art and queer activism, drawing on examples such as the NAMES Project AIDS Memorial Quilt, the UK AIDS Memorial Quilt and hand made objects from a range of archives, such as the Museum of Transology. Their latest books include Crafted with Pride (2023) and Queer Crafts (2026).

Fountain has written publications about numerous contemporary artists, such as L.J. Roberts, Paul Yore, Adejoke Tugbiyele, Rose Schmits, Hamad Butt, and Troy Montes-Michie. They make regular media appearances and have recently contributed to articles for The Conversation and BBC Culture.

== Education ==
Born in Swindon, Wiltshire, in 1994, Fountain studied Fine Art and English literature at Aberystwyth University before completing an M.A. in Arts and Cultural Management at King's College London in 2015. In 2021, they received a Ph.D. from the Centre for Doctoral Training in Feminism, Sexual Politics and Visual Culture at Loughborough University, where they were supervised by Hilary Robinson.

== Career ==
Between 2018 and 2021, Fountain taught part time in a number of art and design programmes at several UK universities including Loughborough University, Nottingham Trent University, Manchester Metropolitan University, and Birmingham City University. Fountain has taught at the University of Exeter since 2021.

They have been widely recognised in a number of publications and public media. For example, in 2024, they were named on Apollo's “40 under 40” list, which recognised global leaders working at the intersection of art and craft. Fountain's art practice has received a range of coverage including by Canadian artist and filmmaker Bruce LaBruce who compared their work to the likes of Leigh Bowery and Paul Yore. The online gallery Rise Art named Fountain as one of 7 leading international artists "who are challenging art history’s canon and celebrating queerness through their art". They are a member of the British Art Network. In 2025, they became a Fellow of the Royal Society of Arts (RSA). The Crafts Council, the UK's independent national charity for craft, have recognised Fountain as a "queer craft expert" and the "world-leading researcher of queer craft" in various articles. Daniel's artwork and practice-based research has also been featured in a number of art and design publications such as the Surface Design Journal, Embroidery: The Textile Art Magazine, and Decorating Dissidence. Daniel is regularly invited to deliver keynote talks and presentations for museums and galleries, such as the Museum of the Home, the Paul Mellon Centre, and the Museum for Art in Wood.

== Selected writings and publications ==
- Queer Crafts: Material Practices and the Making of Identity (London and New York: Bloomsbury, 2026).
- Crafted with Pride: Queer Craft and Activism in Contemporary Britain (Bristol and Chicago: Intellect Books and University of Chicago Press, 2023).
- "Constructed Masculinities: Unpicking Working-Class Masculinities through Knitting.” TEXTILE: Cloth and Culture 23, no. 5 (2025): 1111–18.
- “Survival of The Knittest: Craft and Queer-Feminist Worldmaking.” MAI: Feminism and Visual Culture, no. 8 (2021).
- “Representing Race and the Politics of Display.” Engage: The International Journal of Visual Art and Gallery Education, no. 42 (April 2019): 21–28.
- Fountain, Daniel. “The UK AIDS Memorial Quilt: Histories of Devon and Cornwall.” In A Queer Scrapbook: Britain and Ireland since 1945, edited by Justin Bengry, Matt Cook, Rebecca Jennings and E-J Scott, 116–7. Manchester: Manchester University Press, 2026.
- Fountain, Daniel. “Queer Cut-Ups: The Collaged Library Books of Joe Orton and Kenneth Halliwell, 1959–1952.” In Queer Print Cultures, edited by Vance Byrd and Javier S. Vendrell, 140–166. Toronto: University of Toronto Press, 2025.
- Fountain, Daniel. “Stitching Together: The UK AIDS Memorial Quilt and Its Oral Histories.” In Crafted with Pride: Queer Craft and Activism in Contemporary Britain, edited by Daniel Fountain, 104–20. Chicago and Bristol: University of Chicago Press and Intellect Books, 2023.
- Fountain, Daniel. “On Faggots and Faggoting: Trash-Talk and Reclaiming the Abject through Art Practice.” In The Routledge Companion to Gender, Sexuality and Culture, edited by Emma Rees, 424–37. London and New York: Routledge, 2022.
- Fountain, Daniel. “Welcome to Faggot Land.” In Paul Yore: WORD MADE FLESH, edited by Max Delany, 264–315. Melbourne: ArtInk, 2023.
- Fountain, Daniel. “Queer Quilts: A Patchworked History.” In The Norfolk Trans Joy Community Quilt Zine, edited by Laura Moseley, 6–9. Norfolk: Common Threads Press, 2023.
- Fountain, Daniel, Yashaswini Chandra, Emma Barker, Marius Kwint, and Pippa Catterall. “The five most romantic paintings of all time – according to art historians”. The Conversation, 2026.
- Fountain, Daniel. “The Fourth Plinth Artwork by Teresa Margolles Is a Powerful Celebration of Trans Life and an Act of Defiance.” The Conversation, 2024.
- Fountain, Daniel. “How the Activist-Ceramicist Angus Suttie Made Pots with Pride.” Crafts Council, 2022.
- Fountain, Daniel. “Queer(ing) Craft.” Decorating Dissidence, 2021.
- Fountain, Daniel. “The Art of Hannah Höch: Queering Collage via Jack Halberstam.” Collage Research Network, 2019.
- Fountain, Daniel. “Gender Identity at the Hayward.” Burlington Contemporary, 2019.

== Exhibitions ==
- Crafted with Pride, Space Station Sixty-Five, 8 August 2023.
- WINK WINK, The Whitaker Art Museum & Gallery, 18 May–23 July 2023.
- It's a joy to be here, 87 Gallery Hull, 21 March–1 April 2023.
- CAMP Tipping Point, Studio KIND, 7–28 January 2023.
- ALPHA, AIR Gallery, Manchester, 22 September–22 October 2022.
- Diverse Voices in Textiles, Loughborough University, 6 June–29 July 2022.
- Knitting and Stitching Show, Alexandra Palace, 6–9 October 2022.
- Festival of Quilts, NEC Birmingham, 29 July–1 August 2021.
- Queer Contemporaries, AIR Gallery, Manchester, 27 August–19 September 2020.
- Queer Art(ists) Now, Archive Gallery, London, 13–22 March 2020.
- Slippery and Subversive, Wellington B.Gray Gallery, North Carolina, 6–26 January 2020.
- Venice Biennale, Palazzo Mora, European Cultural Centre, 11 May–24 November 2020.
- Re-Imagining Citizenship, Martin Gall Exhibition Space, Loughborough, 13–29 March 2019.
