= National Notifiable Diseases Surveillance System =

The National Notifiable Diseases Surveillance System may refer to:

- National Notifiable Diseases Surveillance System (Australia)
- National Notifiable Diseases Surveillance System (United States)
