= Geraldine Pittman Woods =

African American neuroembyrologist

- Born: January 29, 1921; West Palm Beach, Florida
- Died: December 27, 1999 (aged 78); Aliso Viejo, California
- Education: Howard University; Radcliffe College
- Known for: Science administration
- Scientific career
- Fields: Embryology

Geraldine Pittman Woods (January 29, 1921 – December 27, 1999) was an American science administrator. She is known for her lifelong dedication to community service and for establishing programs that promote minorities in STEM fields, scientific research, and basic research.

== Early life and education ==
Woods was born January 29, 1921, in West Palm Beach, Florida, to Susie (King) and Oscar Pittman. In the fourth grade, Woods transferred from a private Episcopalian school to Industrial High School, the only public school in the area that allowed African-American students. She graduated from high school in 1938 and attended Talladega College, a historically black college in Talladega, Alabama.

Neither of her parents had higher than an eighth grade education, and Woods's father died when she was a teenager, but her mother was very adamant about Woods doing well in school. Woods once stated:

"My mother paid for everything. She had a tremendous commitment to education in general and my education in particular... Since she was always aware that she never had the opportunity to get an education, she wanted me, her only child, to have all the education I desired."

In 1940, Woods's mother fell ill and was admitted to Johns Hopkins Hospital in Baltimore, Maryland. In order to be closer to her, Woods transferred to Howard University in Washington, D.C. At Howard University, Woods excelled in biology and other science classes. Dr. Louis Hansborough, a professor at Howard, encouraged her to continue studying embryology after graduation in 1942. Woods then attended a Radcliffe College and Harvard University partnership program to earn a master of science degree in 1943 and a Ph.D. in neuro-embryology in 1945.

In 1945 she was also elected into Phi Beta Kappa, a national honors society, for her scholastic achievements.

== Career ==
=== 1940s–1950s ===
After earning her doctorate, Woods briefly took a position as an instructor at Howard University, her alma mater, until 1946. She then took a 25-year hiatus from science to focus on her family.

=== 1960s ===
Woods became heavily involved with local volunteering and community affairs, particularly those pertaining to minorities. Over time, her volunteer efforts expanded to national levels. Starting in 1963, she served a four-year term on the Personnel Board of the California Department of Employment. The following year, she became a member of the National Institute of General Medical Sciences (NIGMS), an institute of the National Institutes of Health (NIH). Later, in 1964, Woods became the first African American woman appointed to the National Advisory General Medical Services (NAGMS) Council, an advisory board for NIGMS. In this position, she addressed the need to improve science education and research opportunities at minority institutions. In 1969 NIGMS appointed her as a special consultant, a highly revered position.

She was a member of the Delta Sigma Theta, a historically African American sorority, for decades, and she served two terms as national president from 1963 to 1967. Under her leadership, in 1967 Delta Sigma Theta founded The Delta Research and Educational Foundation (DREF), a nonprofit that aids organizations with foundations in community service.

Woods's feats in community development caught the eye of First Lady Claudia Alta Taylor "Lady Bird" Johnson in 1965, thus Woods was invited to the White House to help launch the Head Start Program, a US anti-poverty program, with Delta Sigma Theta. Then, in 1968, President Lyndon B. Johnson himself appointed her Chairman of the Defense Advisory Committee on Women in the Services, a committee that aids women serving in the US Armed Forces.

=== 1970s ===
From 1968 through 1972 she continued her work in community service as the vice chair of the Community Relations Conference of Southern California.

In 1972 two national programs Woods worked on at NIGMS, the Minority Access to Research Careers Program (MARC) and the Minority Biomedical Research Support Program (MBRS), were finally initiated, though she had trouble persuading administrators at Black colleges to get involved. At that point many were wary because of the long years they'd been out of the spotlight.

As of 1978, Woods served as chairman of the board of trustees of Howard University. During her tenure, she spoke at the dedication of Elizabeth Catlett's sculpture Students Aspire.

=== 1980s–1990s ===
By 1980, the MARC and MBRS had increased in popularity and hundreds of students were benefitting from the programs across the country. Along with her other notable leadership positions, Woods headed Howard University's board of trustees from 1975 to 1988.

She eventually retired from the NIH and many of her leadership positions in 1991.

== Awards and honors ==
Woods has earned numerous awards for her dedication to community service and minority rights, including the Mary Church Terrell Award of Delta Sigma Theta and the Scroll of Merit of the National Medical Association in 1979, the Howard University Achievement Award in 1980, and a Distinguished Leadership Achievement Award from the National Association for Equal Opportunity in Higher Education in 1987.

In 1978, the sixth annual NIGMS Minority Biomedical Support (MBS) symposium held at the Atlanta University Center in Georgia was dedicated to Woods. The Federal City Chapter of Delta Sigma Theta Sorority, Inc. recognized Woods's contributions to the sorority by establishing the Geraldine P. Woods Sciences Award in 1994. At the Annual Biomedical Research Conference for Minority Students (ABRCMS) in 2003, NIGMS unveiled the Geraldine Woods Award because of her pivotal role in the development of the MBRS and MARC, two NIH minority programs. This award recognizes individuals who have had a significant impact in promoting the advancement of underrepresented minorities in biomedical science.

A fellowship in biology at Howard University and one in chemistry at Atlanta University have both been established in her name. She has also earned honorary degrees at Benedict College, Talladega College, Fisk University, Bennett College, Meharry Medical College, and Howard University.

== Personal life ==
During her time as an instructor at Howard, she met and married Robert Woods, a dentistry student at Meharry Medical College. After he graduated from dentistry school they moved to Los Angeles, California where Woods put her career on hold to raise their three children, Jan, Jerri, and Robert.

Woods once said, "I was so busy 'driving' that I couldn't find time to research and write. But I think I made a lasting contribution to science nevertheless."

After a long illness Woods died on December 27, 1999, in her Aliso Viejo home.
