= PWX =

PWX may refer to:

- Premiere Wrestling Xperience
- Pro Wrestling eXpress
- Providence and Worcester Railroad (NASDAQ ticker: PWX)
- PWX, the first radio station in Cuba; see History of broadcasting
- Space weather experiment PWx, aboard the satellite Demonstration and Science Experiments

== See also ==
- PW (disambiguation)
- WX (disambiguation)
- PX (disambiguation)
