= WX =

WX may refer to:

== Computing ==
- wxWidgets, a GUI widget toolkit
- Windows 10, a Microsoft operating system
- WeChat (pinyin: Wēixìn), a Chinese social app

== Other uses ==
- WX notation, for Indian languages
- Weather (WX in Morse code shorthand)
  - WX01 - WX10, NOAA Weather Radio channels
- Wakefield Exchange, venue in West Yorkshire (stylised as WX)
- County Wexford, Ireland (WX on vehicle plates)
- CityJet, an Irish airline (IATA code: WX)

== See also ==
- XW (disambiguation)
- W (disambiguation)
- X (disambiguation)
