= Public Health (Infectious Diseases) Regulations 1985 =

United Kingdom statutory instrument

- Statutory Instrument
- Parliament of the United Kingdom
- Citation: SI 1985/434
- Introduced by: Kenneth Clarke, Department of Health and Social Security

Dates
- Made: 19 March 1985
- Laid before Parliament: 21 March 1985
- Commencement: 22 March 1985
- Revoked: 1 October 1988

Other legislation
- Made under: Public Health (Control of Disease) Act 1984
- Revoked by: Public Health (Infectious Diseases) Regulations 1988

Status: Revoked

Text of statute as originally enacted

The Public Health (Infectious Diseases) Regulations 1985 (SI 1985/434) was a statutory instrument of the United Kingdom which extended certain parts of the Public Health (Control of Disease) Act 1984 regarding notifiable diseases to AIDS. Therefore although AIDS was not classified as a notifiable disease, many of the powers which may be exercised in relation to notifiable diseases were also allowed in dealing with AIDS patients. The instrument was laid before Parliament on 21 March 1985, and came into effect the next day. It was revoked by the Public Health (Infectious Diseases) Regulations 1988 (SI 1988/1546).

== Provisions ==
The provisions of the instrument include:

- Applying certain public health powers used for notifiable diseases to AIDS. This allowed patients with AIDS to be subject to compulsory medical examination, removal to and detention in a hospital upon order by a justice of the peace (if necessary ex parte). It also extended regulations on the disposal of the body of someone who had died of AIDS.
- Section 38 of the Public Health (Control of Disease) Act 1984 (regarding detention in hospital) was extended in order to allow for detention if a justice of the peace thought that a patient would not take proper precautions to prevent the spread of AIDS in a wider sense than in the original act.

== Use ==
Health minister Kenneth Clarke did not make AIDS a notifiable disease because of fears it would deter people from getting tested; Clarke said the regulations were "intended for use in very exceptional circumstances only". The powers under this instrument were only used once, in Manchester in September 1985. Roger George Youd was detained under the powers of Section 38 because he was "bleeding copiously" while attempting to discharge himself. The order was made after a five minute hearing, due to the risk of transmission through the man's blood. He was detained for three weeks at Monsall Hospital but the order was reversed after ten days on appeal, after the man's condition had improved and Manchester City Council, who had asked for the original order, were satisfied that there was no justification for the man to continue to be detained. Justice Russell, who heard the appeal, noted that the original order was proper given the evidence before the magistrates at the time.

== In popular culture ==
The instrument is mentioned in the British television drama It's A Sin, after one of the characters is detained because he has AIDS. He is released after his lawyer shows the order is null and void as it is made under the original 1984 act, not the powers in the 1985 regulations.

== See also ==
- HIV/AIDS in the United Kingdom
