= Ivor Robinson =

Ivor Robinson may refer to:

- Ivor Robinson (craftsman) (1924–2014), British master craftsman and bookbinder
- Ivor Robinson (physicist) (1923–2016), American mathematical physicist
