= Tesfagiorgis =

Tesfagiorgis is a surname. Notable people with the surname include:

- Paulos Tesfagiorgis (fl. 1983), Eritrean activist
- Freida High Wasikhongo Tesfagiorgis (born 1946), American painter and art historian
