= Adejoke Tugbiyele =

Nigerian-American visual artist and activist

Adejoke Aderonke Tugbiyele
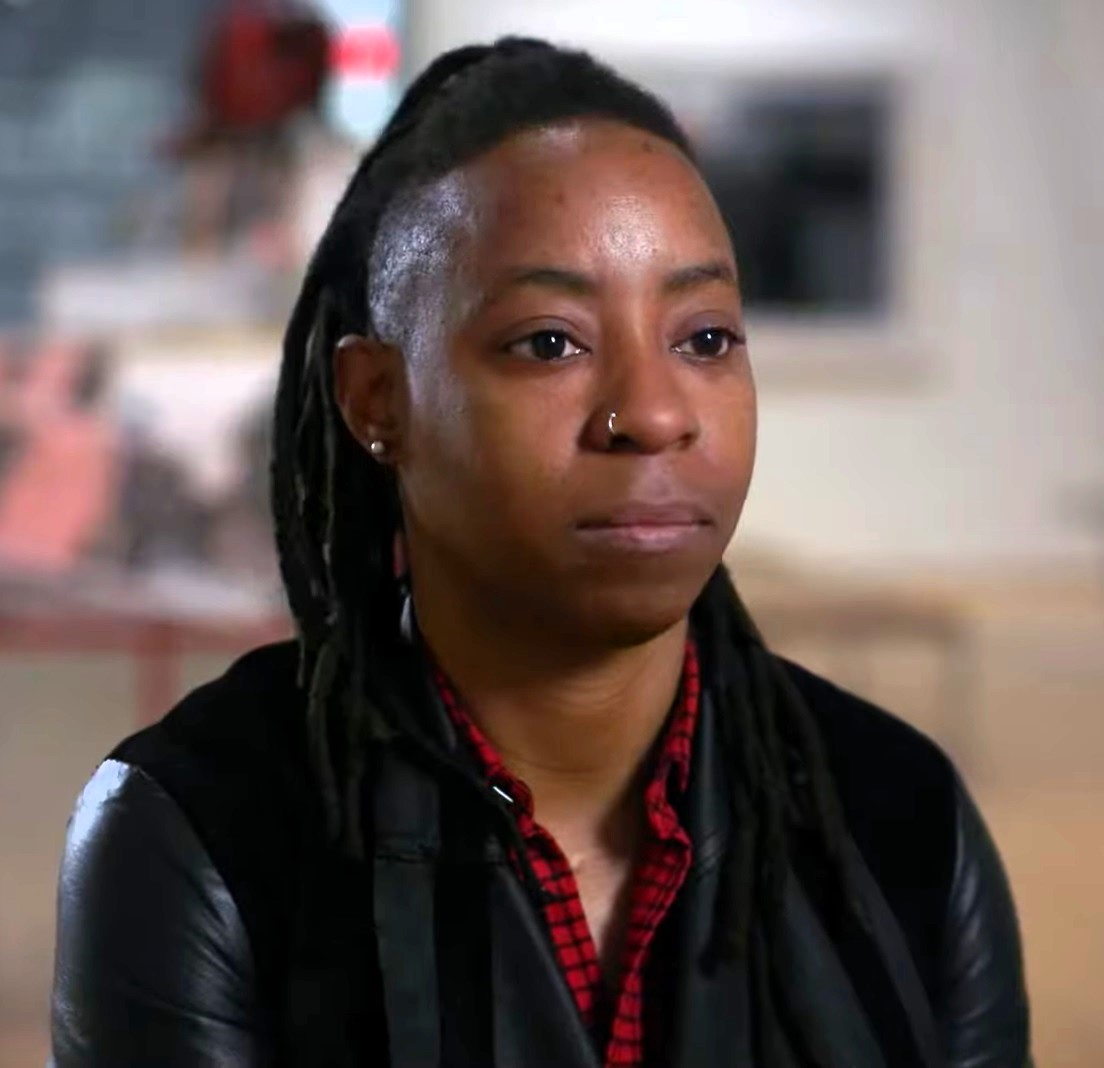
- Tugbiyele in 2013
- Born: December 4, 1977 (age 48); Brooklyn, New York City, New York, U.S.
- Education: High School of Art and Design
- Alma mater: New Jersey Institute of Technology, Maryland Institute College of Art
- Occupations: multidisciplinary visual artist, filmmaker, Activist

Adejoke Aderonke Tugbiyele (born December 4, 1977) is a Nigerian-American multidisciplinary visual artist and activist. She is known primarily as a sculptor, performer, and filmmaker, but has also worked in painting, drawing, and textiles. Her work deals with issues of human rights, queer rights and women's rights. She lives in Ouagadougou, Burkina Faso.

== Biography ==
=== Early life ===
Adejoke Aderonke Tugbiyele was born December 4, 1977, in Brooklyn, New York City, New York. At the age of four, she moved with her family to Lagos, Nigeria and lived there until she was 11. In high school, she returned to New York City to attend the High School of Art and Design. She is queer.

=== Education ===
Tugbiyele has a B.S. degree (2002) in architecture from New Jersey Institute of Technology; and a M.F.A. degree (2013) from the Rinehart School of Sculpture at Maryland Institute College of Art (MICA).

=== Organizational affiliation ===
Tugbiyele has been affiliated with the Nigerian NGO, Initiative for Equal Rights which provides emergency assistance to LGBTQ Nigerians. She has served as a United States-based representative for Solidarity Alliance for Human Rights, a coalition of Nigerian organizations working for human rights, queer rights and activism, and to fight against HIV/AIDS. She is also a juror and mentor for an organization that supports queer artists in Nigeria called Queer Artists Fund.

=== Artistic career ===
Many of Tugbiyele’s sculptures are made from palm spines from West African brooms, which are often used across cultures as a symbolic act of cleansing negative energy from society, and also used in jumping the broom customs. Tugbiyele's work has been influenced by artists including El Anatsui, Fela Kuti, Ai Weiwei, Kara Walker, Zanele Muholi, and Rotimi Fani-Kayode.

Her work is in various public museum collections, including the Brooklyn Museum, and Museum of Modern Art, Warsaw.

In an interview with the British art historian Daniel Fountain, Tugbiyele described that they think about their artistic practice as 'hybrid' in approach. They explained: "‘Hybridity frees the mind from the boundaries and limitations of gender and sexuality, and from the human body in general. It takes us into the spiritual realm, where we can begin to imagine new ways of perceiving and being in the world. Hybridity also makes us more aware of the two-spirit nature of humans and therefore the potential ability to tap into different energies, spontaneously".

== Awards ==
- 2024: Joan Mitchell Center Artist Residency in New Orleans
- 2019: Prix Lieridon Grand Prize
- 2016: Joan Mitchell Painters and Sculptors Grant
