= Paul Yore =

Australian artist

- Born: c. 1988; Melbourne, Australia
- Education: Monash University, Melbourne
- Known for: Contemporary art
- Movement: Textile arts, installation art, queer art

Paul Yore (born c. 1988) is an Australian contemporary artist. He works with a variety of media including tapestry, banners, quilted hangings, and large-scale installations of mixed media, and his work covers political, religious and LGBT themes.

== Early life and education ==
Yore was born around 1988, and raised in a Catholic household. His father was a Franciscan priest, who worked as a missionary in Papua New Guinea, where he met Yore's mother.

Yore studied archaeology and anthropology and painting as part of a fine arts degree at Monash University, graduating in 2010.

== Art practice ==
Yore works with a variety of media including tapestry, banners, quilted hangings, and large-scale installations of mixed media, with frequent use of found and discarded materials. His work covers political, religious and LGBT themes.

He sometimes uses trash in his artworks, creating a kind of "kitsch queerness", "bad taste aesthetic", to challenge people's perceptions, and to examine excess consumption in society. He also uses humour to engage viewers with serious ideas, saying:

I draw on the bawdy, camp kind of humour that drag queens, for example, would use — and in that instance, bad taste is more like a survival mechanism and a sort of pressure valve.

As of 2022 he is based in Gunaikurnai country in Gippsland, Victoria.

== Career ==
Yore's first large solo show was held in 2009 at Heide Museum of Modern Art in Melbourne.

He began his work with needlepoint in the United Kingdom in 2010, while recovering from a mental health crisis. The repetitive activity of embroidery helped him to recover from the effects of being detained and medicated against his will. Yore says:

I credit working in hand-sewn textiles almost daily as one of the key reasons I have stayed sober for over a decade

A 15-year survey exhibition of his works, titled WORD MADE FLESH, was held at the Australian Centre for Contemporary Art from September to November 2022. The exhibition was curated and designed in collaboration between Paul Yore, Devon Ackerman (Yore's partner) and Max Delaney, the artistic director of the ACCA. The first monograph of Yore's work was also published with essays by international artists and scholars, including Tony Albert, hanna baer, Mikala Dwyer, Daniel Fountain, Helen Hughes, and Bruce LaBruce.

== Reception ==
Yore has been described as one of Australia’s most provoking artists.

In June 2013, police cut seven images of children's faces from one of Yore's works entitled Everything is Fucked, that was on display at an exhibition at the Linden Centre for Contemporary Art in St Kilda. Yore was charged with producing and possessing child pornography, in relation to the collage that included images of children’s faces pasted onto images of adults engaging in sex acts. During the period he was facing these charges, some of his other works were selected for the Primavera exhibition at the Museum of Contemporary Art Australia in Sydney. In 2014, the charges were dismissed, and the prosecution was required to pay Yore's legal costs.

In September 2013, one of Yore's installations was withdrawn from the 2013 Sydney Contemporary art fair on the grounds that it would have been in breach of criminal law in New South Wales.

In 2019, a piece by Yore entitled Taste The Feeling 2018 was taken down from an exhibition at the Mostyn gallery in Llandudno, following a complaint to the police that it breached hate crime laws.

== Selected exhibitions ==
- 2013: Poetry, Dream and the Cosmos, Heide Museum of Modern Art, Melbourne
- 2013: Here There and Everywhere, Seoul Art Space Geumcheon, Korea
- 2013: Melbourne Now, National Gallery of Victoria, Melbourne
- 2014: Primavera, Museum of Contemporary Art, Sydney
- 2016: Soft Core, Casula Powerhouse Arts Centre, Sydney
- 2016: The Public Body .01, Artspace, Sydney
- 2016: Spectacular Spectacular, NADA Art Fair, Miami
- 2017: Mad Love, A3 Arnt Art Agency, Berlin
- 2022–2023: WORD MADE FLESH, October–November 2022 at Australian Centre for Contemporary Art, Melbourne; then at Carriageworks in January–February 2023 (part of Sydney Festival)
