= Students Aspire =

Public artwork in Washington, D.C., United States

Coordinates: 38.9218°N 77.0215°W

- Artist: Elizabeth Catlett
- Year: 1977
- Type: Bronze
- Dimensions: 426.72 cm × 140.208 cm (168.00 in × 55.200 in)
- Location: Washington, D.C.
- Owner: Howard University

Students Aspire is a public artwork by American artist Elizabeth Catlett, located at 2300 6th Street NW on the Howard University campus in Washington, D.C., United States. Upon its completion, James E. Cheek called the work "a most significant addition to the outdoor sculpture on the university’s campus.” Students Aspire was originally surveyed as part of the Smithsonian's Save Outdoor Sculpture! survey in 1993.

== Description ==
This bronze relief shows an African-American male and female figure in profile facing each other. The figures each have one hand on each other's waist and the other hand is raised above their heads. The raised hands are reaching towards a middle disk; part of a set of five which form an arch over the figures. Each disk has an image of a scientific or technological symbol. Beneath the figures is a square relief of the root system of a tree and at the end of each root is a face.

It is signed "EC 77."

=== Information ===
A plaque is placed on the wall just beneath the relief reading:

ELIZABETH CATLETT 1915–
1977
THE SCULPTURE AND THE
CHEMICAL ENGINEERING WING
WERE MADE POSSIBLE BY A
GRANT FROM THE
EXXON EDUCATION FOUNDATION

=== History of the piece ===
Elizabeth Catlett was chosen to be the artist for this work by vote from faculty, staff and students of the College of Engineering. In 1973, a $600,000 grant from the Exxon Education Foundation was being used to construct the chemical engineering wing of the University's engineering building. Exxon offered an additional $30,000 to fund art for the new engineering wing and that gift was approved in 1974.

An art committee was set up to manage the selection of the artist for the project. Twenty-two artists were invited to participate and fourteen responded. A total of eight sketches of proposed artworks were submitted for display in the lobby of the engineering building and based on the response, four of the eight artists that submitted work were invited to submit maquettes of their proposed sculptures. Upon submitting their maquettes, artists spoke at the College about their proposals.

In 1976, a vote was held and staff, faculty and students from the engineering school voted. Catlett's work won the contest. The sculpture was dedicated on May 12, 1978. Geraldine Pittman Woods spoke at the dedication.

=== Description from Elizabeth Catlett ===
“The two students are holding each other up to express unity rather than the competition that exists in education. The equal sign signifies scientific as well as social equality—that everyone should be equal; men to women, students to faculty, blacks to everyone else. The students form the trunk of a tree. The medallions are arranged in a triangle like branches and the plaque represents the roots.” She went on to say: “I was happy to have the suggestions of the faculty and students. I listened to what they had in mind and then I incorporated that in my own way.” – Elizabeth Catlett

=== Condition ===
This sculpture was surveyed in 1993 for its condition and it was determined that treatment was needed.
