= Michael Sundin =

English television presenter

- Born: 1 March 1961; Low Fell, Gateshead, County Durham, England
- Died: 23 July 1989 (aged 28); Newcastle General Hospital, Newcastle upon Tyne, England
- Occupations: Television presenter; actor; dancer; trampolinist
- Years active: 1980–1989

Michael Sundin (1 March 1961 – 23 July 1989) was an English television presenter, actor, dancer and trampolinist. He was a presenter of the BBC children's programme Blue Peter for 77 episodes between 1984 and 1985.

== Early life and career ==
Michael Sundin was born in Low Fell, Gateshead, County Durham (now Tyne and Wear). His parents were Alan and Joyce Sundin, and he had a brother named David.

After winning five British titles and one world title in British & World Trampolining tournaments, he entered show business in 1980 when he appeared in the pantomime Jack and the Beanstalk, with Barbara Windsor. Sundin made various television and theatre appearances, both as an actor and dancer, which led to a long run in the Cameron Mackintosh-produced musical Cats, in which he played Bill Bailey in its West End run from 1982 until 1983. He also appeared in the video for Culture Club's I'll Tumble 4 Ya from 1982.

In 1984, he began rehearsing the character Tik-Tok for the Walt Disney film Return to Oz, and this was covered by the long-running BBC children's magazine programme Blue Peter. Sundin impressed the editor, Biddy Baxter, and was invited to audition for the presenting vacancy left by Peter Duncan; one of the audition items was to interview someone on a trampoline, and he presented his first programme on 13 September 1984.

After fronting 77 episodes, the editors and production team for Blue Peter decided not to renew Sundin's contract following the summer break, because they felt that he had little rapport with the viewers and it was claimed by the editor that some parents and children complained about his effeminacy. However, coverage in the press of him as a gay man was also rumoured to have been a factor. He presented his last show on 24 June 1985. Sundin was very unhappy about this decision, and made his feelings known in the tabloid press. Four months later, a response occurred through the printing of photographs of Sundin dancing with a male stripper in London.

In 2007, the former editor of Blue Peter Biddy Baxter was interviewed by journalist Mark Lawson, transmitted as part of BBC Four's Children's TV on Trial week of programmes. For the first time on television, Baxter was confronted about the departure of Sundin. In the interview Baxter blamed the press for the inaccurate coverage of Sundin's sacking from the programme because of his sexuality. In previous documentaries and programmes, Baxter had avoided addressing such questions about Sundin's involvement in the programme. In the interview, she denied that he had been sacked due to his sexuality and said that "It was his leaving the programme because children didn't like him – nothing to do with his sexual proclivities".

Sundin subsequently appeared in the film Lionheart (1987) in which he was incorrectly credited as "Michel Sundin". From 1987 to 1988, he was in a UK theatre tour of Seven Brides for Seven Brothers and a Japanese/Australian tour of Starlight Express.

One of his final public appearances was as a dancer in the video for Rick Astley's She Wants to Dance With Me (1988).

== Death ==
Panel from the UK AIDS Memorial Quilt memorialising Sundin, featuring the Blue Peter logo and red ribbons.

In 1988, Sundin fell ill. At the age of 28, he died in the Newcastle General Hospital, Newcastle upon Tyne. The Times newspaper reported (on 26 July 1989) that he had died of liver cancer. It was later reported that he died from an AIDS–related illness. He was the first former Blue Peter presenter to die.

Following his death, Sundin was memorialised in the UK AIDS Memorial Quilt as part of Quilt 12, the panel featuring the Blue Peter logo and red ribbons expressing solidarity with people living with HIV/AIDS.

== Filmography ==
Year	Title	Role	Notes
1983	Forever Young	Peter	
1983	The Cleopatras	Dancer	Episode: "35 BC"
1984–1985	Blue Peter	Host	Recurring role (77 episodes)
1984	Danger: Marmalade at Work	Billy	Episode: "Shame"
1985	Return to Oz	Tik-Tok (In-suit performer)	
1985	The Walt Disney Comedy and Magic Revue	Tik-Tok (In-suit performer)	Archive footage
1985	The Saturday Picture Show	Himself	
1985	Dreamchild	March Hare	
1986	Artists and Models	Model	Episode: "Men and Wild Horses"
1986	Artists and Models	Model	Episode: "Slaves of Fashion"
1987	Lionheart	Bertram	
