= Freida High Wasikhongo Tesfagiorgis =

American art historian

- Education: Northern Illinois University B.S; University of Wisconsin-Madison M.A and M.F.A.; University of Chicago Ph.D.
- Occupations: painter; professor; art historian

Freida High Wasikhongo Tesfagiorgis (born October 21, 1946) is a painter, art historian, and visual culturalist who focuses on African American, modern and contemporary African art, African Diaspora, and modern European Art and Primitivism. She is Professor Emerita, Departments of African-American Studies, Gender & Women’s Studies, and Art, University of Wisconsin-Madison. In 2021 she was the recipient of a Lifetime Achievement Award at the 31st Annual James A. Porter Colloquium on African American Art at Howard University. In 2022 she received the Wisconsin Visual Art Achievement Award (Legacy/Lifetime Achievement).

== Education ==
Tesfagiorgis received her A.A. from Graceland College, Lamoni, Iowa, her B.S. from Northern Illinois University, DeKalb, Illinois, her M.A. and M.F.A. from University of Wisconsin-Madison, and her Ph.D. from University of Chicago.

== Publications ==
- Tesfagiorgis, Freida High W.. 1987. “Afrofemcentrism in the Art of Elizabeth Catlett and Faith Ringgold.” Sage; Atlanta, Ga. 4 (1).
- Tesfagiorgis, Freida High W. 1993. “In Search of a Discourse and Critique/s That Center the Art of Black Women Artists.” Included in:

- 1993. Theorizing Black Feminisms: The Visionary Pragmatism of Black Women, edited by Stanlie M. James and Abena P. A. Busia. London ; New York: Routledge.
- 1997. Gendered Visions: The Art of Contemporary Africana Women Artists, edited by Herbert F. Johnson Museum of Art and Salah M. Hassan. Trenton, NJ: Africa World Press.
- 2001. Black Feminist Cultural Criticism. Keyworks in Cultural Studies, edited by Jacqueline Bobo. 3. Malden, Mass: Blackwell.
- 2015. Feminism-Art-Theory: An Anthology 1968-2014, edited by Hilary Robinson. Second Edition. Malden, MA: Wiley Blackwell.

- High, Freida. 1999. “An Interwoven Framework of Art History and Black Feminism: Framing Nigeria.” In Contemporary Textures: Multidimensionality in Nigerian Art, edited by Nikru Nzegwu. Binghamton, N.Y: International Society for the Study of Africa, Binghamton University.
