= Ivor Robinson (craftsman) =

British master craftsman and bookbinder

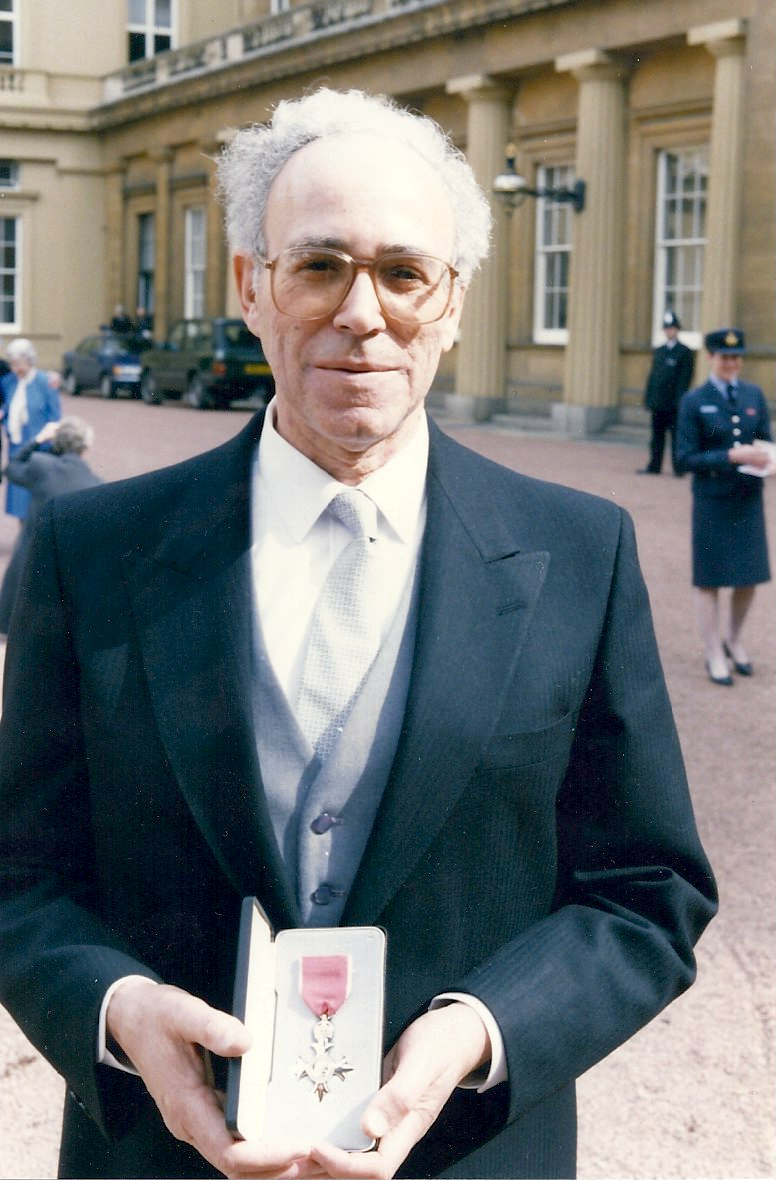
- Ivor Robinson after being appointed an MBE by Queen Elizabeth II at Buckingham Palace in 1992
- Born: 28 October 1924
- Died: 19 February 2014 (aged 89); Holton, Oxford, UK
- Known for: Bookbinding
- Awards: MBE for services to Bookbinding, 1992; Prix Paul Bonet, 1971

Ivor Robinson MBE (28 October 1924 – 19 February 2014) was a British master craftsman and fine bookbinder, one of the most important of the late 20th century. He is particularly known for his mature work with gold-tooled lines on black leather. His work is held in high esteem, entering many public and private collections around the world, and fetching good prices at auction. He was also an influential teacher of bookbinding. He was appointed an MBE for services to bookbinding in 1992.

== Personal life and biography ==
Robinson was born and raised in Bournemouth (then Hampshire; now Dorset), England. (His younger brother, Brian Robinson, also a bookbinder, lived there until his death in 2023). He was apprenticed at age 14 with bookbinder S. E. Bray & Co. He volunteered to enlist in the Navy during World War II, where he was present at D-Day, and returned to Bray's to finish his apprenticeship after the War.

In 1946, Robinson moved to Salisbury to work with binder Harry Bailey, eventually going into partnership with him. While in Salisbury he also taught bookbinding part-time at Salisbury College of Art, where he met Olive Trask, whom he married 14 April 1952. They had two children, Hilary Robinson (1956– ) and Martin Robinson (1962– ).

== Teaching ==
Ivor Robinson taught at the London School of Printing and Graphic Arts (now London College of Communication, part of the University of the Arts London) from 1953, then in 1958 moved to Oxford to teach at the Oxford College of Technology, which became Oxford Polytechnic and later Oxford Brookes University. He retired from the Polytechnic in 1989.

His book, Introducing Bookbinding, was published in 1968.

== Bookbinding ==
Robinson's bindings are in private and public collections around the world, including the British Library; the Bodleian Library, Oxford; and the Pierpont Morgan Library (Now the Morgan Library & Museum), New York

Robinson has been called 'one of the world's most highly regarded binders' and one 'of the great bookbinders of the day' and his bindings have been shown in more than 100 exhibitions since 1951 and are in several royal, public and private collections in many parts of the world. An eight-tape interview with Robinson about his life and work is held by the British Library as part of its 'Crafts Lives' archive.

A Robinson binding was sold for £5,000 in 2009. Another, The Illiad, was listed for $5,000 in 2005 The seller, Joshua Heller Rare Books, Inc., of Washington DC, describes Robinson: "After war service in the Royal Navy, he completed his apprenticeship with a local bookbinder and then worked in Salisbury with Harry Bailey as Bailey and Robinson, Bookbinders."

A Robinson binding of Virgil's Georgics was listed by Thomas Goldwasser Rare Books, San Francisco, Winter 2013, for $13,500

== Prizes and awards ==
He was elected a Fellow of the Guild of Contemporary Bookbinders in 1955 and President from 1968 to 1973 of its successor, Designer Bookbinders. He was a triple medallist at the Prix Paul Bonet in Switzerland in 1971.

He was appointed a Member of the British Empire in the New Year's Honours' List of 1992.
