= Public Health (Infectious Diseases) Regulations 1988 =

- Statutory Instrument
- Parliament of the United Kingdom
- Citation: SI 1988/1546
- Introduced by: Ministry of Health

Dates
- Made: 6 September 1988
- Laid before Parliament: 9 September 1988
- Commencement: 1 October 1988
- Revoked: 6 April 2010

Other legislation
- Repeals/revokes: Public Health (Infectious Diseases) Regulations 1968; Public Health (Infectious Diseases) Regulations 1985
- Made under: Public Health (Control of Disease) Act 1984
- Revoked by: Health Protection (Notification) Regulations 2010

Status: Revoked

Text of statute as originally enacted

The Public Health (Infectious Diseases) Regulations 1988 (SI 1988/1546), created by the Department of Health and Social Care, came into force on 1 October 1988 and was associated with the previous Public Health (Control of Disease) Act 1984. 24 more diseases were added, indicating exact control powers that could be applied to individual diseases. The regulations also revoked the previous Public Health (Infectious Diseases) Regulations 1985 (SI 1985/434).

== Notifiable diseases ==
In addition to cholera, plague, relapsing fever, smallpox, typhus and food poisoning, the regulations of 1988 consist of 24 additional conditions:

- Acute encephalitis
- Acute poliomyelitis
- Meningitis
- Meningococcal septicaemia
- Anthrax
- Diphtheria
- Dysentery
- Paratyphoid fever
- Typhoid fever
- Viral hepatitis
- Leprosy
- Leptospirosis
- Measles
- Mumps
- Rubella
- Whooping cough
- Malaria
- Tetanus
- Yellow fever
- Ophthalmia neonatorum
- Rabies
- Scarlet fever
- Tuberculosis
- Viral haemorrhagic fever

Scotland and Northern Ireland required notification of chicken pox and legionellosis in addition to the above.
