= James Herring =

American painter (1794–1867)

James Herring (12 January 1794 – October 1867) was an American painter who specialized in portrait painting.

== Biography ==
His father emigrated to the United States in 1804, and became a brewer and distiller in the Bowery neighborhood of New York City. The son began by coloring prints and maps, and moved to Philadelphia, where he entered into the business of coloring maps, but returned to New York, and settled in Chatham Square as a portrait painter.

He illustrated, with James Barton Longacre, American biography in the National Portrait Gallery (3 vols., Philadelphia, 1834–39).

== Family ==
His son, Frederick William Herring (born in New York City, 24 November 1821), studied art with his father and Henry Inman, and also devoted himself to portrait painting.
