= Troy Montes-Michie =

American artist

Troy Michie
- Born: 1985 (age 40–41); El Paso, Texas
- Education: University of Texas at El Paso; BFA, 2009; Yale School of Art; MFA, 2011

Troy Montes-Michie (born 1985) is an American interdisciplinary painter and collage artist.

== Early life and education ==
Troy Michie was born in El Paso, TX. He received a BFA from the University of Texas at El Paso in 2009 and an MFA from the Yale School of Art in Painting/Printmaking in 2011.

== Career ==
Michie participated in the Tuesday Night MFA Lecture Series at BU School of Visual Arts.

=== Fat Cat Came To Play ===
On December 3, 2017, Michie held his first solo exhibition Fat Cat Came To Play through Company Gallery, which lasted until January 21, 2018. In the solo exhibition, Michie explores the significance of zoot suits, which are “broad-shouldered suits that were popular with Italian, black, and Latino men in the United States in the 1940s”. The installation was inspired by the Zoot Suit Riots, which took place in 1943 after white servicemen attacked a group of Mexican Americans wearing Zoot suits. The artist was also inspired by forms of dazzle camouflage. Unlike his earlier works, which dealt with sex, Fat Cat Came To Play focused on exploring “blackness, queerness, and sexuality within an assemblage” by expressing socio-economic traits on to the Zoot Suit. In many of his installations, Michie cuts out the faces of photographs from this era to address that these histories of the minorities are still relevant today. A notable piece of the exhibition was “Disruptive Patterns”, which aimed to remind people that police officers were among the attackers in the Zoot Suit Riots. The exhibition stayed true to Michie's philosophy of representing the cultural expressions, specifically through fashion, of “historically marginalized American male figures”.

== Exhibitions ==
- "Found: Queer Archaeology; Queer Abstraction”, Leslie-Lohman Museum of Gay and Lesbian Art
- Stedelijk Museum-Hertogenbosch
- "Rites of Spring" (group show), Contemporary Arts Museum Houston, (January 11, 2014 – September 3, 2014)
- "A Constellation" (group show), The Studio Museum in Harlem, (November 12, 2015 – June 3, 2016)
- "Trigger: Gender as a Tool and a Weapon" (group show), The New Museum, (September 27, 2017 – January 21, 2018)
- 2019 Whitney Biennial, Whitney Museum of American Art; curated by Rujeko Hockley and Jane Panetta
- 2022 "Rock of Eye", California African American Museum (CAAM) Los Angeles, California; curated by Andrea Anderson
- The Banner Project: Troy Montes Michie, Museum of Fine Arts Boston, Boston, Massachusetts (June 25, 2024 – June 23, 2025)
