= XW =

XW or xw may refer to:

== Language ==
- Xw, a digraph used in the Kurdish and the Tlingit language to represent /xʷ/; see List of Latin-script digraphs
- ⟨x̱w⟩, a digraph used in Alaskan Tlingit to represent /χʷ/; see List of Latin-script digraphs

== Transportation ==
- Ford Falcon (XW), several cars including Ford Futura (XW), Ford Fairmont (XW)
- XW, a model of PSA X automobile engine
- NokScoot (former IATA code: XW), a 2014–2020 Thai low-cost airline
- Sky Express (Russia) (former IATA code: XW), a 2006–2011 Russian low-cost airline
