= List of statutory instruments of the United Kingdom, 1985 =

This is an incomplete list of statutory instruments of the United Kingdom in 1985.

== Statutory instruments ==
=== 1-499 ===
==== 1–100 ====
- Canterbury and Shepway (Areas) Order 1985 (SI 1985/20)
- Cherwell and West Oxfordshire (Areas) Order 1985 (SI 1985/21)
- Dacorum and Three Rivers (Areas) Order 1985 (SI 1985/27)
- Horsham and Mid Sussex (Areas) Order 1985 (SI 1985/28)
- Remuneration of Teachers (Primary and Secondary Education) (Amendment) Order 1985 (SI 1985/38)
- Arun and Chichester (Areas) Order 1985 (SI 1985/41)
- Durham and Easington (Areas) Order 1985 (SI 1985/42)
- East Hertfordshire and Welwyn Hatfield (Areas) Order 1985 (SI 1985/51)
- Mid Devon, South Hams and Teignbridge (Areas) Order 1985 (SI 1985/52)
- Carrick (Parishes) Order 1985 (SI 1985/54)
- North Dorset (Parishes) Order 1985 (SI 1985/55)
- Hereford and Worcester (Areas) Order 1985 (SI 1985/56)
- South Bedfordshire (Parishes) Order 1985 (SI 1985/57)
- Driving Licences (Exchangeable Licences) Order 1985 (SI 1985/65)
- Wrexham Maelor (Communities) Order 1985 (SI 1985/89)
- Adur, Arun and Worthing (Areas) Order 1985 (SI 1985/90)

== 101–200 ==
- Arun (Parishes) Order 1985 (SI 1985/119)
- Derbyshire and Nottinghamshire (Areas) Order 1985 (SI 1985/120)
- Torfaen (Communities) Order 1985 (SI 1985/129)
- Braintree, Chelmsford and Colchester (Areas) Order 1985 (SI 1985/133)
- County of North Yorkshire (Electoral Arrangements) Order 1985 (SI 1985/139)
- County of Bedfordshire (Electoral Arrangements) Order 1985 (SI 1985/140)
- Kerrier (Parishes) Order 1985 (SI 1985/142)
- New Forest (Parishes) Order 1985 (SI 1985/150)
- Winchester (Parishes) Order 1985 (SI 1985/154)
- Police Pensions (Amendment) Regulations 1985 (SI 1985/156)
- East Staffordshire (Parishes) Order 1985 (SI 1985/163)
- Wychavon (Parishes) Order 1985 (SI 1985/164)
- Nature Conservation and Amenity Lands (Northern Ireland) Order 1985 (SI 1985/170) (N.I. 1)
- Wildlife (Northern Ireland) Order 1985 (SI 1985/171) (N.I. 2)
- Basingstoke and Deane (Parishes) Order 1985 (SI 1985/179)
- Medina (Parishes) Order 1985 (SI 1985/180)
- West Oxfordshire (Parishes) Order 1985 (SI 1985/181)

== 201–300 ==
- Road Traffic Accidents (Payments for Treatment) (England and Wales) Order 1985 (SI 1985/202)
- Family Practitioner Committees (Membership and Procedure) Regulations 1985 (SI 1985/213)
- County of Cleveland (Electoral Arrangements) Order 1985 (SI 1985/219)
- Banking Act 1979 (Advertisements) Regulations 1985 (SI 1985/220)
- Hampshire (Areas) Order 1985 (SI 1985/228)
- Local Government (Prescribed Expenditure) (Amendment) Regulations 1985 (SI 1985/257)
- County of Cornwall (Electoral Arrangements) Order 1985 (SI 1985/264)
- County of South Glamorgan (Electoral Arrangements) Order 1988 (SI 1985/265)
- Charnwood (Parishes) Order 1985 (SI 1985/269)
- Road Traffic Accidents (Payments for Treatment) (Scotland) Order 1985 (SI 1985/281)
- North Hertfordshire (Parishes) Order 1985 (SI 1985/286)
- Home Loss Payments (Scotland) Order 1985 (SI 1985/292)

== 301–400 ==
- Third Country Fishing (Enforcement) Order 1985 (SI 1985/313)
- Braintree (Parishes) Order 1985 (SI 1985/325)
- National Health Service (Charges for Drugs and Appliances) Amendment Regulations 1985 (SI 1985/326)
- County of West Sussex (Electoral Arrangements) Order 1985 (SI 1985/335)
- County of Wiltshire (Miscellaneous Electoral Division) (Electoral Arrangements) Order 1985 (SI 1985/336)
- Legal Advice and Assistance (Scotland) Amendment Regulations 1985 (SI 1985/337)
- Seeds (National Lists of Varieties) (Fees) (Amendment) Regulations 1985 (SI 1985/356)
- Plant Breeders' Rights (Fees) Regulations 1985 (SI 1985/357)
- Public Trustee (Fees) Order 1985 (SI 1985/373)
- National Health Service (Charges to Overseas Visitors) Amendment Regulations 1985 (SI 1985/383)
- Seed Potatoes (Fees) (Scotland) Regulations 1985 (SI 1985/385)

== 401–500 ==
- Dacorum (Parishes) Order 1985 (SI 1985/401)
- South Wight (Parishes) (Variation) Order 1985 (SI 1985/402)
- Public Health (Infectious Diseases) Regulations 1985 (SI 1985/434)
- Seed Potatoes (Fees) Regulations 1985 (SI 1985/438)
- Friendly Societies (Northern Ireland) Order 1985 (SI 1985/453) (N.I. 4)
- Local Elections (Northern Ireland) Order 1985 (SI 1985/454)
- The Basingstoke and Deane (Parish of Woodmancott) Order 1985 (SI 1985/494)

== 501–600 ==
- Mid-Sussex Water Order 1985 (SI 1985/513)
- Legal Aid (Scotland) (Fees in Criminal Proceedings) Amendment Regulations 1985 (SI 1985/554)
- Legal Aid (Scotland) (Fees in Civil Proceedings) Amendment Regulations 1985 (SI 1985/557)
- Gaming Act (Variation of Monetary Limits) Order 1985 (SI 1985/575)
- Borough of Wrexham Maelor (Electoral Arrangements) Order 1985 (SI 1985/580)

== 601–700 ==
- Guildford (Parishes) (Variation) Order 1985 (SI 1985/634)
- Gaming Act (Variation of Monetary Limits) (Scotland) Order 1985 (SI 1985/641)
- Merchant Shipping (Application of Construction and Survey Regulations to other Ships) Regulations 1985 (SI 1985/661)
- Borough of Tamworth (Electoral Arrangements) Order 1985 (SI 1985/667)
- Police (Complaints) (Mandatory Referrals, etc.) Regulations 1985 (SI 1985/673)
- District of Glyndwr (Electoral Arrangements) Order 1985 (SI 1985/695)
- Borough of Ynys Mon-Isle of Anglesey (Electoral Arrangements) Order 1985 (SI 1985/696)

== 701–800 ==
- Pilkington UK5 Light Railway Order 1985 (SI 1985]/725)
- District of Meirionnydd (Electoral Arrangements) Order 1985 (SI 1985/742)
- Six Pit and Upper Bank Junctions Light Railway Order 1985 (SI 1985/747)
- Extradition (Taking of Hostages) Order 1985 (SI 1985/751)
- Foreign Limitation Periods (Northern Ireland) Order 1985 (SI 1985/754) (N.I. 5)
- Road Traffic (Type Approval) (Northern Ireland) Order 1985 (SI 1985/755) (N.I. 6)
- Water and Sewerage Services (Amendment) (Northern Ireland) Order 1985 (SI 1985/756) (N.I. 7)

== 801–900 ==
- Alton Station Light Railway Order 1985 (SI 1985/810)
- Rate Limitation (Designation of Authorities) (Exemption) (Wales) Order 1985 (SI 1985/823)
- Sheriff Court Fees Order 1985 (SI 1985/827)
- Lydney and Parkend Light Railway Order 1985 (SI 1985/844)
- Export of Goods (Control) Order 1985 (SI 1985/849)
- Measuring Instruments (EEC Pattern Approval Requirements) (Fees) (Amendment) Regulations 1985 (SI 1985/852)
- Companies (Forms) Regulations 1985 (SI 1985/854)
- Value Added Tax (General) Regulations 1985 (SI 1985/886)

== 901–1000 ==
- Remuneration of Teachers (Primary and Secondary Education) (Amendment) (No. 2) Order 1985 (SI 1985/944)
- Milk (Cessation of Production) (Northern Ireland) Order 1985 (SI 1985/958) (N.I. 9)
- Rent (Amendment) (Northern Ireland) Order 1985 (SI 1985/959) (N.I. 10)
- Social Security (Industrial Injuries) (Prescribed Diseases) Regulations 1985 (SI 1985/967)
- Seeds (Fees) Regulations 1985 (SI 1985/981)
- National Health Service (General Medical and Pharmaceutical Services) Amendment (No. 4) Regulations 1985 (SI 1985/995)

== 1001–1100 ==
- Merchant Shipping (Formal Investigations) Rules 1985 (SI 1985/1001)
- Agriculture Improvement Scheme 1985 (SI 1985/1029)
- Building Regulations 1985 (SI 1985/1065)
- Building (Approved Inspectors etc.) Regulations 1985 (SI 1985/1066)
- Food (Revision of Penalties and Mode of Trial) (Scotland) Regulations 1985 (SI 1985/1068)

== 1101–1200 ==
- Explosives (Licensing of Stores and Registration of Premises) Fees Regulations 1985 (SI 1985/1108)
- Grampian Region and City of Aberdeen (Electoral Arrangements) Amendment Order 1985 (SI 1985/1127)
- Opencast Coal (Rate of Interest on Compensation) (No. 2) Order 1985 (SI 1985/1130)
- Acquisition of Land (Rate of Interest after Entry) (No. 2) Regulations 1985 (SI 1985/1131)
- Acquisition of Land (Rate of Interest after Entry) (Scotland) (No. 2) Regulations 1985 (SI 1985/1132)
- County of Greater Manchester (Electoral Arrangements) Order 1985 (SI 1985/1173)
- Teachers (Compensation for Redundancy and Premature Retirement) Regulations 1985 (SI 1985/1181)
- Town and Country Planning (Fees for Applications and Deemed Applications) (Amendment) Regulations 1985 (SI 1985/1182)

== 1201–1300 ==
- Betting, Gaming, Lotteries and Amusements (Northern Ireland) Order 1985 (SI 1985/1204) (N.I. 11)
- Credit Unions (Northern Ireland) Order 1985 (SI 1985/1205) (N.I. 12)
- Local Government (Miscellaneous Provisions) (Northern Ireland) Order 1985 (SI 1985/1208) (N.I. 15)
- Social Security (Northern Ireland) Order 1985 (SI 1985/1209) (N.I. 16)
- Merchant Shipping (Grain) Regulations 1985 (SI 1985/1217)
- Merchant Shipping (Fire Protection) (Ships built before 25 May 1980) Regulations 1985 (SI 1985/1218)
- Milton Keynes (Parish of Newport Pagnell) Order 1985 (SI 1985/1233)
- Grampian Region (Electoral Arrangements) Amendment Order 1985 (SI 1985/1235)
- Gordon District (Electoral Arrangements) Order 1985 (SI 1985/1236)
- Remuneration of Teachers (Further Education) (Amendment) (No. 2) Order 1985 (SI 1985/1248)
- Video Recordings Act 1984 (Commencement No. 2) Order 1985 (SI 1985/1264)
- Video Recordings Act 1984 (Scotland) (Commencement No. 2) Order 1985 (SI 1985/1265)
- Agriculture Improvement Regulations 1985 (SI 1985/1266)
- Election Petition (Amendment) Rules 1985 (SI 1985/1278)
- North Bedfordshire (Parishes) Order 1985 (SI 1985/1297)

== 1301–1400 ==
- Merchant Shipping (Certification of Deck Officers) Regulations 1985 (SI 1985/1306)
- Ionising Radiations Regulations 1985 (SI 1985/1333)
- SI 1985/1352
- Great Yarmouth (Parishes) Order 1985 (SI 1985/1368)

== 1401–1500 ==
- Statutory Sick Pay (Additional Compensation of Employers and Consequential Amendments) Regulations 1985 (SI 1985/1411)
- County of West Yorkshire (Electoral Arrangements) Order 1985 (SI 1985/1448)
- Driving Licences (Exchangeable Licences) (No. 2) Order 1985 (SI 1985/1461)
- Data Protection Regulations 1985 (SI 1985/1465)

== 1501–1600 ==
- City of Edinburgh District and Midlothian District (Danderhall) Boundaries Amendment Order 1985 (SI 1985/1543) (S. 118)
- Pensions Increase (Review) Order 1985 (SI 1985/1575)
- Building (Prescribed Fees etc.) Regulations 1985 (SI 1985/1576)
- Rheilffordd Llyn Tegid Light Railway Order 1985 (SI 1985/1578)
- Motor Cycles (Eye Protectors) Regulations 1985 (SI 1985/1593)
- Public Telecommunication System Designation (Swindon Cable Limited) Order 1985 (SI 1985/1596)

== 1601–1700 ==
- Hovercraft (Fees) Regulations 1985 (SI 1985/1605)
- West Dorset (Parishes) Order 1985 (SI 1985/1606)
- Merchant Shipping (Fees) Regulations 1985 (SI 1985/1607)
- Borough of Taff-Ely (Electoral Arrangements) Order 1985 (SI 1985/1609)
- Beer Regulations 1985 (SI 1985/1627)
- Child Abduction (Northern Ireland) Order 1985 (SI 1985/1638) (N.I. 17)
- Sex Discrimination (Amendment) (Northern Ireland) Order 1985 (SI 1985/1641) (N.I. 18)
- Air Navigation Order 1985 (SI 1985/1643)
- Industrial Training (Transfer of the Activities of Establishments) Order 1985 (SI 1985/1662)
- Merchant Shipping (Protective Clothing and Equipment) Regulations 1985 (SI 1985/1664)
- Merchant Shipping (Indemnification of Shipowners) Order 1985 (SI 1985/1665)
- Borough of Ogwr (Electoral Arrangements) Order 1985 (SI 1985/1685)
- County of Merseyside (Electoral Arrangements) Order 1985 (SI 1985/1686)

== 1701–1800 ==
- Borough of Delyn (Electoral Arrangements) Order 1985 (SI 1985/1707)
- Rules of the Air and Air Traffic Control Regulations 1985 (SI 1985/1714)
- Merchant Shipping (Fees) (Amendment No. 2) Regulations 1985 (SI 1985/1727)
- Police (Scotland) Amendment (No. 3) Regulations 1985 (SI 1985/1733)
- District of Alyn and Deeside (Electoral Arrangements) Order 1985 (SI 1985/1747)
- Isle of Wight (District Boundaries) Order 1985 (SI 1985/1753)
- Brecknock (Communities) Order 1985 (SI 1985/1763)
- District of Rhymney Valley (Electoral Arrangements) Order 1985 (SI 1985/1786)
- North Warwickshire (Parishes) Order 1985 (SI 1985/1790)
- Aylesbury Vale (Parishes) Order 1985 (SI 1985/1792)
- Boarding-out and Fostering of Children (Scotland) Regulations 1985 (SI 1985/1799)
- Police and Criminal Evidence Act 1984 (Application to Customs and Excise) Order 1985 (SI 1985/1800)

== 1801–1900 ==
- Lliw Valley (Communities) Order 1985 (SI 1985/1816)
- Mendip (Parishes) Order 1985 (SI 1985/1847)
- Artificial Insemination of Cattle (Animal Health) (Scotland) Regulations 1985 (SI 1985/1857)
- Artificial Insemination of Cattle (Animal Health) (England and Wales) Regulations 1985 (SI 1985/1861)
- Legal Advice and Assistance at Police Stations (Remuneration) Regulations 1985 (SI 1985/1880)
- Education (Grants for Teacher Training) (No. 2) Regulations 1985 (SI 1985/1883)
- Shropshire (District Boundaries) Order 1985 (SI 1985/1891)
- Castle Morpeth and Tynedale (District Boundaries) Order 1985 (SI 1985/1892)

== 1901–2000 ==
- Transport Act 1985 (Modifications in Schedule 4 to the Transport Act 1968) Order 1985 (SI 1985/1903)
- Contracting-out (Transfer Premiums) Regulations 1985 (SI 1985/1928)
- Building (Inner London) Regulations 1985 (SI 1985/1936)
- Police and Criminal Evidence Act 1984 (Codes of Practice) (No. 1) Order 1985 (SI 1985/1937)
- Registration of Births, Deaths and Marriages (Fees) Order 1985 (SI 1985/1960)
- Judicial Pensions (Requisite Benefits) (Amendment) Order 1985 (SI 1985/1975)
- Designs Rules 1984 (SI 1985/1989)
- Extradition (Internationally Protected Persons) (Amendment) Order 1985 (SI 1985/1990)

== 2001–2100 ==
- Control of Pollution (Anti-Fouling Paints) Regulations 1985 (SI 1985/2011)
- Mid Sussex (Parishes) Order 1985 (SI 1985/2021)
- East Yorkshire Borough of Beverley (Parishes) Order 1985 (SI 1985/2022)
- Reporting of Injuries, Diseases and Dangerous Occurrences Regulations 1985 (SI 1985/2023)
- Police Pensions (War Service) (Transferees) Regulations 1985 (SI 1985/2029)
- Block Grant (Education Adjustments) (England) Regulations 1985 (SI 1985/2030)
- Nightwear (Safety) Regulations 1985 (SI 1985/2043)
- Derbyshire (District Boundaries) Order 1985 (SI 1985/2048)
- Oxfordshire (District Boundaries) Order 1985 (SI 1985/2049)
- Ipswich and Suffolk Coastal (District Boundaries) Order 1985 (SI 1985/2050)
- South Lakeland (Parishes) Order 1985 (SI 1985/2052)
- North East Derbyshire (Parishes) Order 1985 (SI 1985/2053)
- Shrewsbury and Atcham (Parishes) Order 1985 (SI 1985/2056)
- Ryedale (Parishes) Order 1985 (SI 1985/2058)
- South Hams (Parishes) Order 1985 (SI 1985/2059)
- Chiltern (Parishes) Order 1985 (SI 1985/2060)
- Devon (District Boundaries) Order 1985 (SI 1985/2061)
- Leicestershire and Nottinghamshire (County and District Boundaries) Order 1985 (SI 1985/2062)
- South Pembrokeshire (Communities) Order 1985 (SI 1985/2063)
- Llanelli (Communities) Order 1985 (SI 1985/2064)
- Misuse of Drugs Regulations 1985 (SI 1985/2066)

== See also ==
- List of statutory instruments of the United Kingdom
