= Wakefield Exchange =

Coordinates: 53.6848°N 1.4977°W

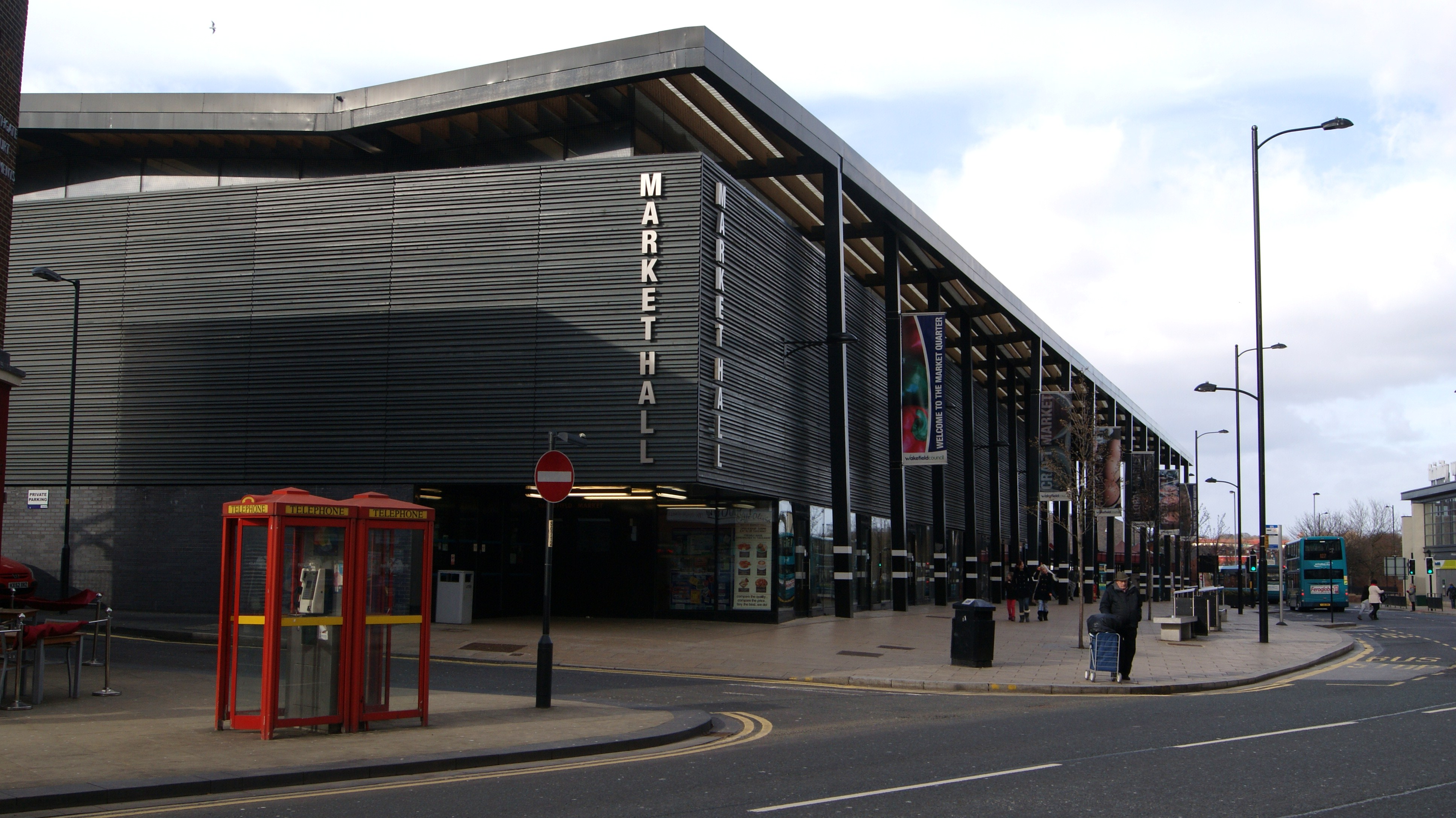
The building in 2013, while in use as a market

Wakefield Exchange, styled as WX, is a public building in the city centre of Wakefield, in West Yorkshire, in England.

The building was designed to serve as Wakefield Market Hall, replacing an older market hall on the site. It was designed by David Adjaye and completed in May 2008. It is supported by glulam columns and beams, clad in cedar wood which has been stained grey, with many walls being of glass. Inside, there were three halls, housing about 50 stalls.

The new market did not prove successful, and in 2014, Wakefield Council made plans to demolish much of the structure. In 2018, the market closed, and the council proposed to retain only the canopy, and replace it with restaurants and a cinema. However, in 2023, it decided instead to retain the building and convert it into the Wakefield Exchange, an events venue with restaurants, a brewery, and space for creative businesses.

== Events ==
Since reopening as Wakefield Exchange, the building has hosted various community events, comedy nights, and concerts.

The building's first live music event was headlined by Corinne Bailey Rae in October 2025. Local band Skinny Living and Heaven 17 have also played at the venue.
