= George House Trust =

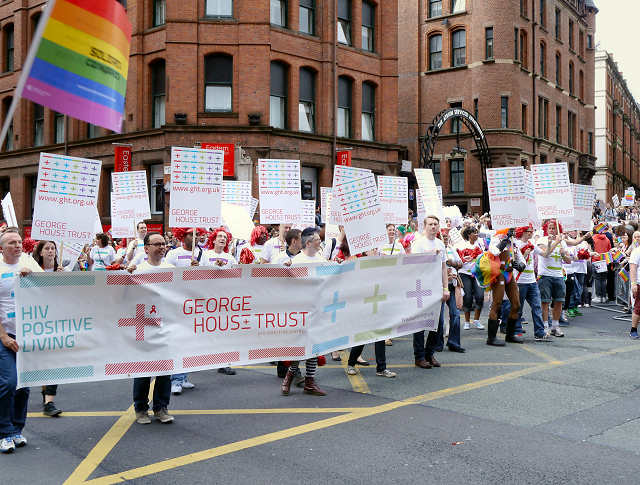
George House Trust at Manchester Pride 2012

George House Trust is a charity based in Manchester supporting people affected by HIV, established in 1985 as the Manchester AIDSLine. It changed its name to the George House Trust in 1992.

In 2025 it was awarded a mark of excellence.
