= Hilary Robinson (scholar) =

British academic and art theorist

Hilary Robinson is a British academic and art theorist. She was granted the 2024 annual Award for Distinction in Femininst Art History by the College Art Association. She is Professor of Feminism, Art, and Theory at Loughborough University's School of Social Sciences and Humanities. She was Dean of the School of Art and Design and a professor at Middlesex University, and previously served as Dean of the College of Fine Arts at Carnegie Mellon University. Her research focuses on the history, theory, and practice of feminist art.

== Education and career ==
Robinson is the daughter of bookbinder Ivor Robinson MBE (28 Oct 1924–19 Feb 2014) and Olive Robinson (née Trask)(5 Apr 1929-8 Aug 2023), a teacher. Robinson graduated with a BA Fine Art from Newcastle University. She then received an MA by thesis in Cultural History from the Royal College of Art in London. At the University of Leeds, she obtained her PhD in Art Theory.

In 1992 she was appointed Lecturer in the School of Art and Design, University of Ulster (now Ulster University) Belfast; she was promoted to Professor of the Politics of Art in 2002 and then to Head of School. In 2005 she became the dean of the College of Fine Arts at Carnegie Mellon University in Pittsburgh, Pennsylvania, where she was chosen to be on the board of several museums, including the Warhol Museum and the Mattress Factory Museum. She returned to England in 2012 to become the dean of the School of Art and Design and Professor of Visual Culture at Middlesex University. She joined Loughborough University's School of Arts, English and Drama in 2017 as Professor of Feminism, Art, and Theory.

== Selected publications and exhibitions ==
=== Books ===
- Robinson, Hilary and Perry, Lara, eds. (2025) Feminisms/Museums/Surveys: An Anthology. Wiley-Blackwell, Malden MA; Oxford UK. ISBN 978-1-119-89758-3
- Robinson, Hilary and Buszek, Maria Elena, eds. (2019) A Companion to Feminist Art. Wiley-Blackwell, Malden MA; Oxford UK. ISBN 978-1-118-92915-5
- Robinson, Hilary, Tobin, Amy, and Gosling, Luci; Reckitt, Hellena, ed. (2018) The Art of Feminism: Images that Shaped the Fight for Equality, 1857–2017. Chronicle Books, San Francisco; and Tate Publishing, London. ISBN 978-1-4521-6992-7
- Robinson, Hilary, ed. (2015) Feminism-art-theory 1968–2014: an anthology. Wiley Blackwell, Malden MA; Oxford UK. ISBN 978-1-118-36060-6
- Robinson, Hilary (2006) Reading art, reading Irigaray: the politics of art by women. I.B. Tauris, London. ISBN 978-1-86064-953-0
- Robinson, Hilary, ed. (2001) Feminism-art-theory : 1968–2000. Wiley-Blackwell, Oxford. ISBN 978-0-631-20849-5
- Robinson, Hilary, ed. (1987) Visibly Female: Feminism and Art Today - An Anthology. Camden Press, London. ISBN 978-0-948491313

=== Book sections ===
- Robinson, Hilary (2021) 'Not White, Not Male, and Not New York: Race, Feminism and Artists in Pittsburgh'. In Feminist Visual Activism and the Body, edited by Sliwinska, Basia, 14–30. New York and Abingdon: Routledge. Part of ISBN 978-0-367-27899-1, OCLC 1191456617
- Robinson, Hilary (2020) 'But does it work in theory? Androcentric blind spots and omissions' In Art and Activism in the Age of Systemic Crisis: Aesthetic Resilience edited by Eliza Steinbock, Bram Ieven, Marijke de Valck, 24–38. New York and Abingdon: Routledge Part of doi:10.4324/9780429269189-2
- Robinson, Hilary (2019) ‘Witness it: Activism, Art, and the Feminist Performative Subject’ in Buszek and Robinson (eds): A Companion to Feminist Art, pp. 243–260 doi:10.1002/9781118929179
- Robinson, Hilary (2019) ‘The early work of Griselda Pollock in the context of developing feminist thinking in art history and criticism.’ In Raluca Bibiri (ed) Griselda Pollock: From Feminism to the Concentrationary and Beyond. Special issue: Images, Imagini, Images Journal of Visual and Cultural Studies n. 7 2017. Iași: Institutul European, Romania, pp. 19–50
- Robinson, Hilary (2012) Pleasure, painting, politics: the three graces – or: why I like Adélaïde Labille-Guiard's Self-Portrait With Two Pupils. In: Artistic Production and the Feminist Theory of Art: New Debates III. Ayuntamiento de Vitoria-Gastiezko Udalak, Victoria-Gastiez, Spain, pp. 306–316. ISBN 978-84-96845-43-5
- Harley, Alison and James, Stephanie and Reid, Eileen and Reid, Seona and Robinson, Hilary and Watson, Yvonne (2008) The third space: a paradigm for internationalism. In: The Student Experience in Art and Design Higher Education: Drivers for Change. Jill Rogers Associates Ltd, Cambridge, pp. 167–187. ISBN 0 9547111 7 3
- Robinson, Hilary and Harley, A. and Reid, E. and Reid, S. and Watson, Y. (2008) The third space: a paradigm for internationalisation. In: The student experience in art and design higher education: drivers for change. Drew, Linda, ed. Jill Rodgers Associates, Cambridge. ISBN 978-0-9547111-7-7
- Robinson, Hilary (2003) Becoming women: Irigaray, Ireland and visual representation. In: Art, Gender and Nation: Ethnic Landscapes, Myths and Mother-Figures. Bhreathnach-Lynch, Sheila and Cusack, Tricia, eds. Ashgate, Aldershot, pp. 113–127. ISBN 978-0-7546-3225-2
- Robinson, Hilary (2000) Whose beauty? Women, art, and inter-subjectivity in Luce Irigaray's writings. In: Beauty Matters. Brand, Peg Zeglin, ed. Indiana University Press, pp. 224–251. ISBN 978-0-253-21375-4

=== Exhibitions ===
- Robinson, Hilary (2012–13) Feminist and ..., Mattress Factory, Pittsburgh, PA

=== Other academic publications ===
Journal papers and other academic publications can be found on ORCID https://orcid.org/0000-0002-3153-3788

- Women, feminism, and art schools: The UK experience, Women's Studies International Forum 2021-02-10 DOI: doi.org/10.1016/j.wsif.2021.102447
