= Cruising for sex =

Walking or driving around in search of sex

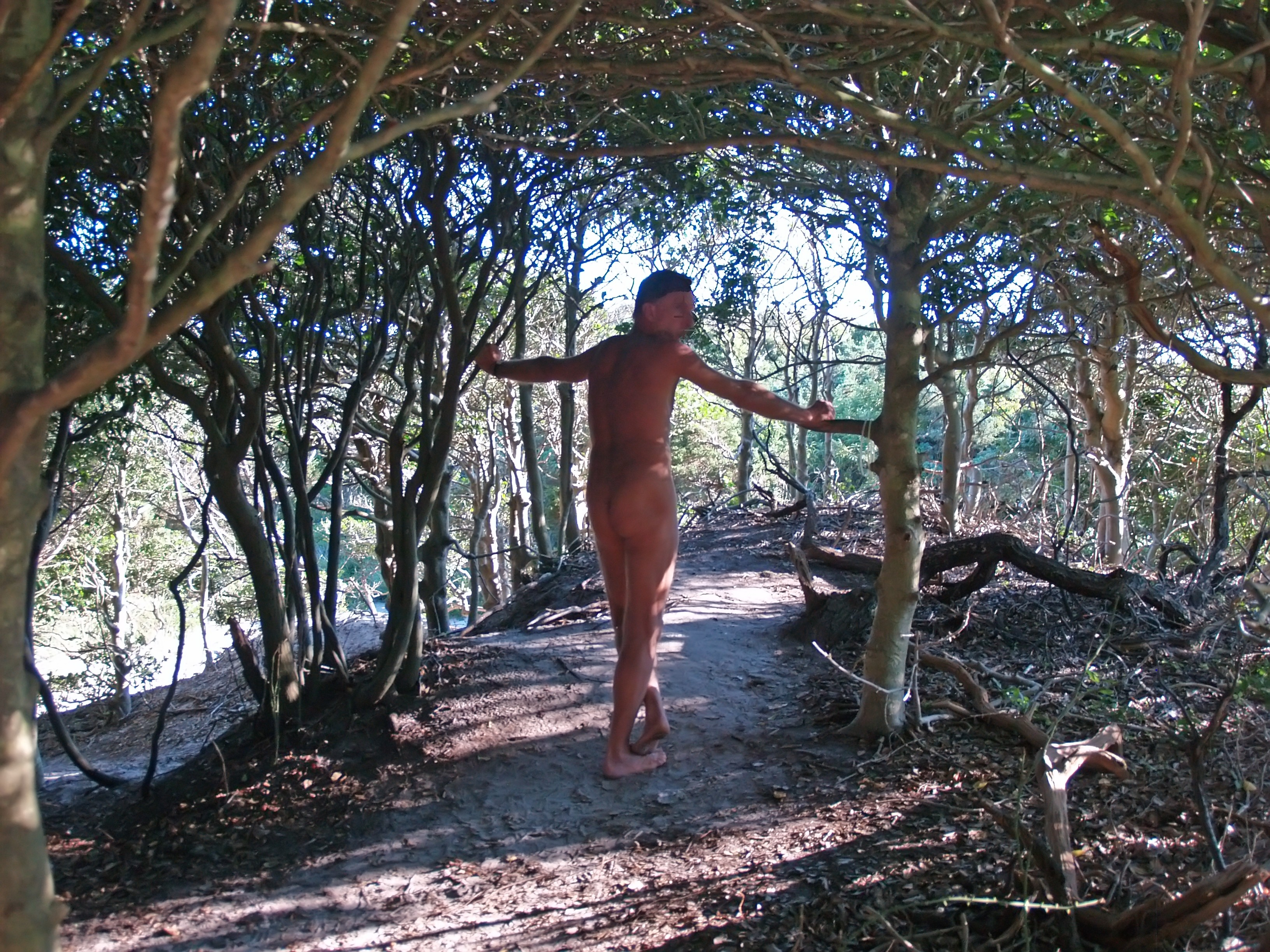
In the 'meatrack' on Fire Island Pines, New York, a man cruises for sex.

Cruising for sex or cruising is walking or driving about a locality, called a cruising ground, in search of a sex partner, usually for an anonymous, casual, one-time encounter. The term is also used when technology is used to find casual sex, such as using an Internet site or a telephone service.

== Etymology and usage of the term "Cruising" ==
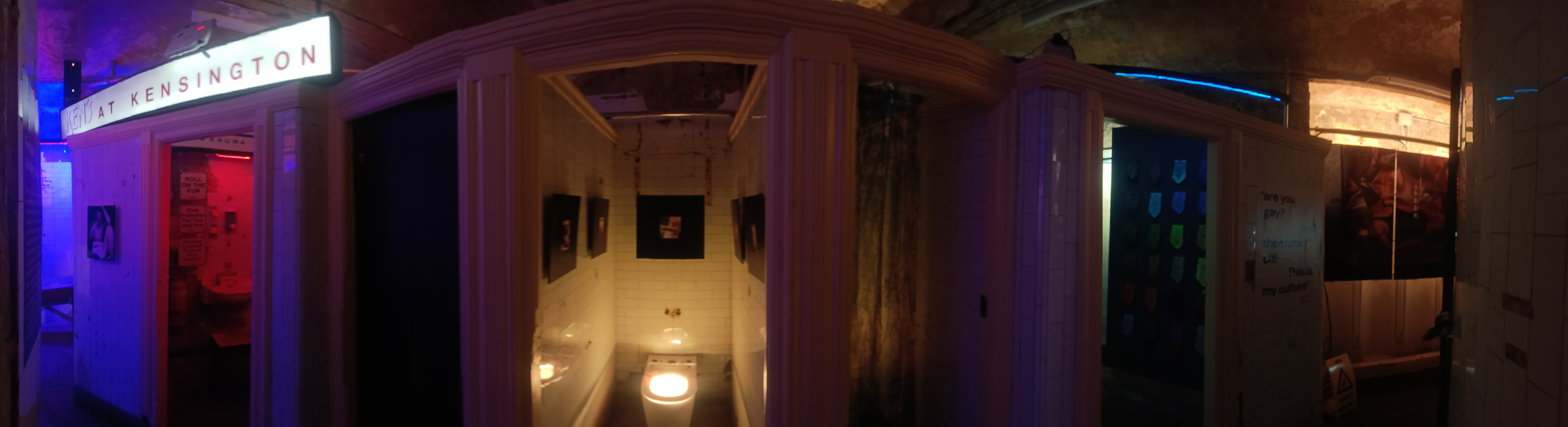
Inside of the underground toilet block exhibition detailing Sydney's gay beat, sauna and cruising culture of the 1980s and '90s. The underground male toilets were opened in 1907 in Taylor Square, Darlinghurst, and then closed in 1998 and are now a part of Qtopia Sydney an LGBTQIA+ Museum in Darlinghurst. 2026

According to historian and author Tim Blanning, the term cruising originates from the Dutch equivalent kruisen.

In gay slang, the term "cruising" originally emerged as an argot or "code word" by which those "in the know" would understand the speaker's unstated sexual intent, whereas most heterosexuals, on hearing the same word in the same context, would normally misread the speaker's intended meaning in the word's more common nonsexual sense. This served (and in some contexts, still serves) as a protective sociolinguistic mechanism for gay men to recognize each other, and avoid being recognized by those who may wish to do them harm in broader societies noted for their homophobia.

In the latter half of the twentieth century, decriminalization of homosexual behaviour increasingly became the norm in English-speaking countries. The protective barrier once provided by the term "cruising" as a "code word" has therefore largely broken down and, arguably, become increasingly irrelevant. Thus the specifically sexual meaning of the term has passed into common usage to include the sexual behavior of heterosexual persons, as well.

== History ==
In the United Kingdom, gay cruising came about due to the illegality of homosexual acts prior to the Sexual Offences Act 1967, and this illegality meant that many gay men could not live openly as homosexuals. Cruising provided a way for gay men to solicit sexual encounters while minimizing the risk of being caught by the police. When cruising first became known, it usually took place in public fields, parks, toilets and theatres were also sometimes denounced as cruising grounds by moralists of the time. In the 20th century sex in public toilets in the UK became known as "cottaging" and the toilets where sex occurred were referred to as "cottages". Public toilets located next to highways, main roads or rural roads have also become popular cruising sites.

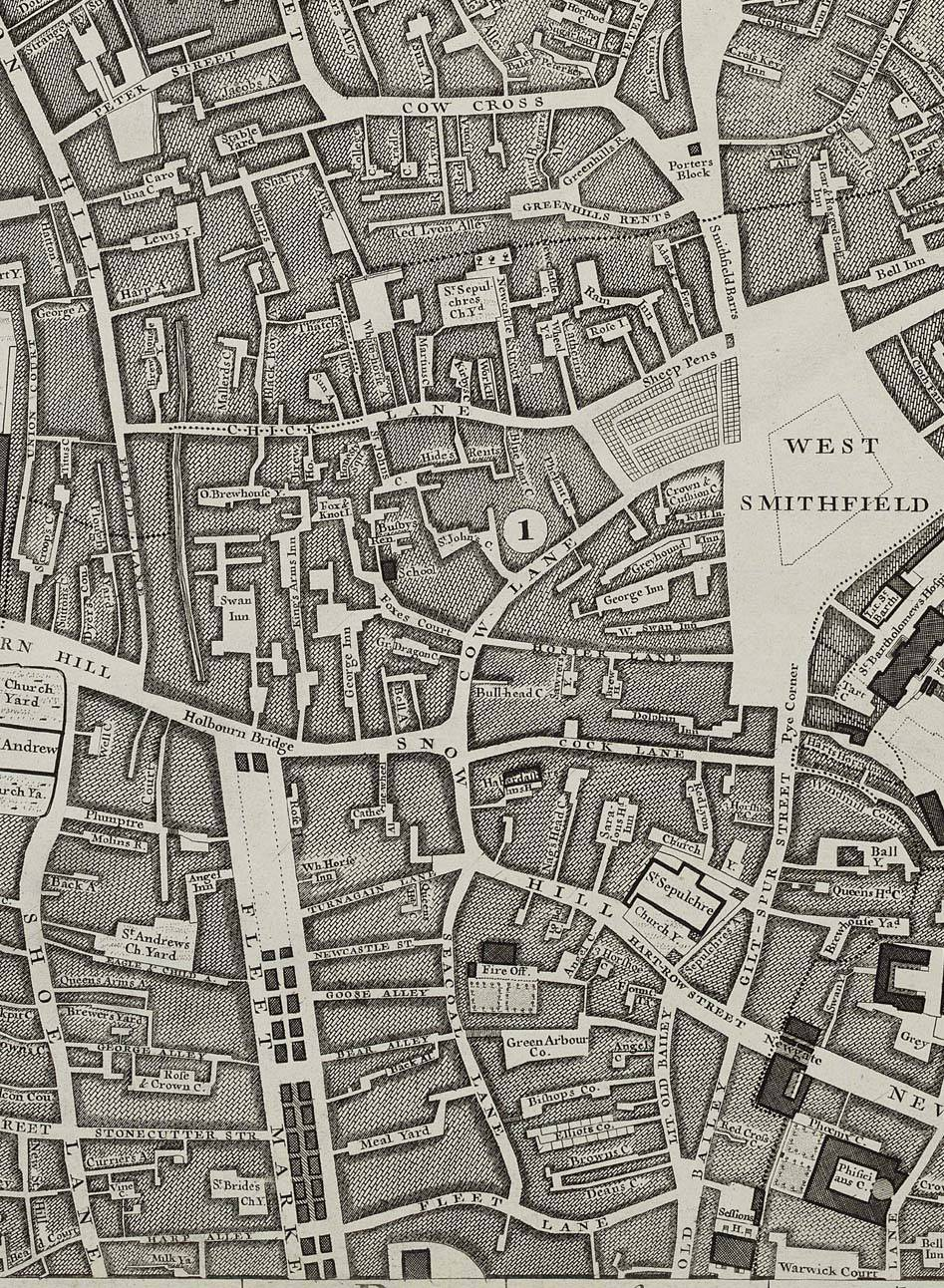
Mother Clap's molly-house was located in Field Lane, Holborn and can be seen on the left side of the map above. Mother Clap's molly-house was the most well known illegal gay brothel in 18th century London and had been open from 1724 to 1726, when a raid sustained by the Societies for the Reformation of Manners had it dismantled and 40 gay men who were present at the molly-house at the time of the raid were taken to Newgate prison where most were eventually set free, although those who weren't were either fined, imprisoned, exhibited in the pillory and three were hanged. Rocque Map of London, 1746.

The illegality of gay sex has meant that the history of gay cruising is sparsely documented, as those who used such cruising grounds were likely to be discreet about them. Rictor Norton, author of Mother Clap's Molly House the title of which is a reference to Margaret Clap's illegal gay brothel known as a "Molly House", believes that the first gay cruising grounds and gay brothels in London may have sprung up in the early 17th century and going from the earliest known records they may have originated even earlier in the late 1600s although they most likely originated much earlier than the 1600s. Mother Clap's molly-house was the most well known of these illegal gay brothels in 18th century London and it had been open from 1724 to 1726, when a raid sustained by the Societies for the Reformation of Manners had it dismantled and 40 gay men who were present at the molly-house at the time of the raid were taken to Newgate prison. Most were eventually set free, although three of those who weren't were hanged; the others were either fined, imprisoned, or exhibited in the pillory.

Author Mark Turner comments that evidence of gay cruising goes back to at least the 18th century and has commented that "From St James's Park in the 18th century to Hampstead Heath today, gay men have always gone cruising in search of sex... ...Cruising is nothing new. It's been going on for hundreds of years, and its history is a part of the history of our cities and public spaces. As cities grew and populations became more anonymous, new opportunities for chance encounters arose, for straight and queer people alike... By night, teenagers hop fences to snog, hookers and rent boys ply their trade, lovers admire the moon, addicts shoot up, and gay men fuck... ...George Michael is right to drop his pants and lay claim to his queer culture - to a history of urban sexual adventure and misadventure that is as old and perverse as the parks themselves." Turner has further commented that in "Thomas Gilbert's 'A View of the Town' from the 18th century, a man leaves his wife in their bridal bed, sneaks off to St James's Park, 'roams in search of some vile ingle prize' and 'courts the foul pathick in the fair one's place'... ...such queer encounters in parks, on embankments, in toilets, streets and back alleys are an integral part of the way our cities - and sexualities - express themselves. Where there is public space, there will be diverse appropriations of it, and so it should be.

== Cruising locations ==
Cruising places are often considered meeting places for men who are otherwise living more conventional lifestyles. For instance, it was noted in Laud Humphreys' 1970 study about anonymous gay sex meeting places that most men who visited those places were at least seeming heterosexuals who had families.

Public health officials have noted that cruising locations are often frequented by men who have sex with men but do not identify as homosexual or bisexual, and are closeted, married, or in relationships with women. These men typically do not frequent gay bars, clubs, or websites and otherwise have no way of meeting men for sex.

=== Australia ===
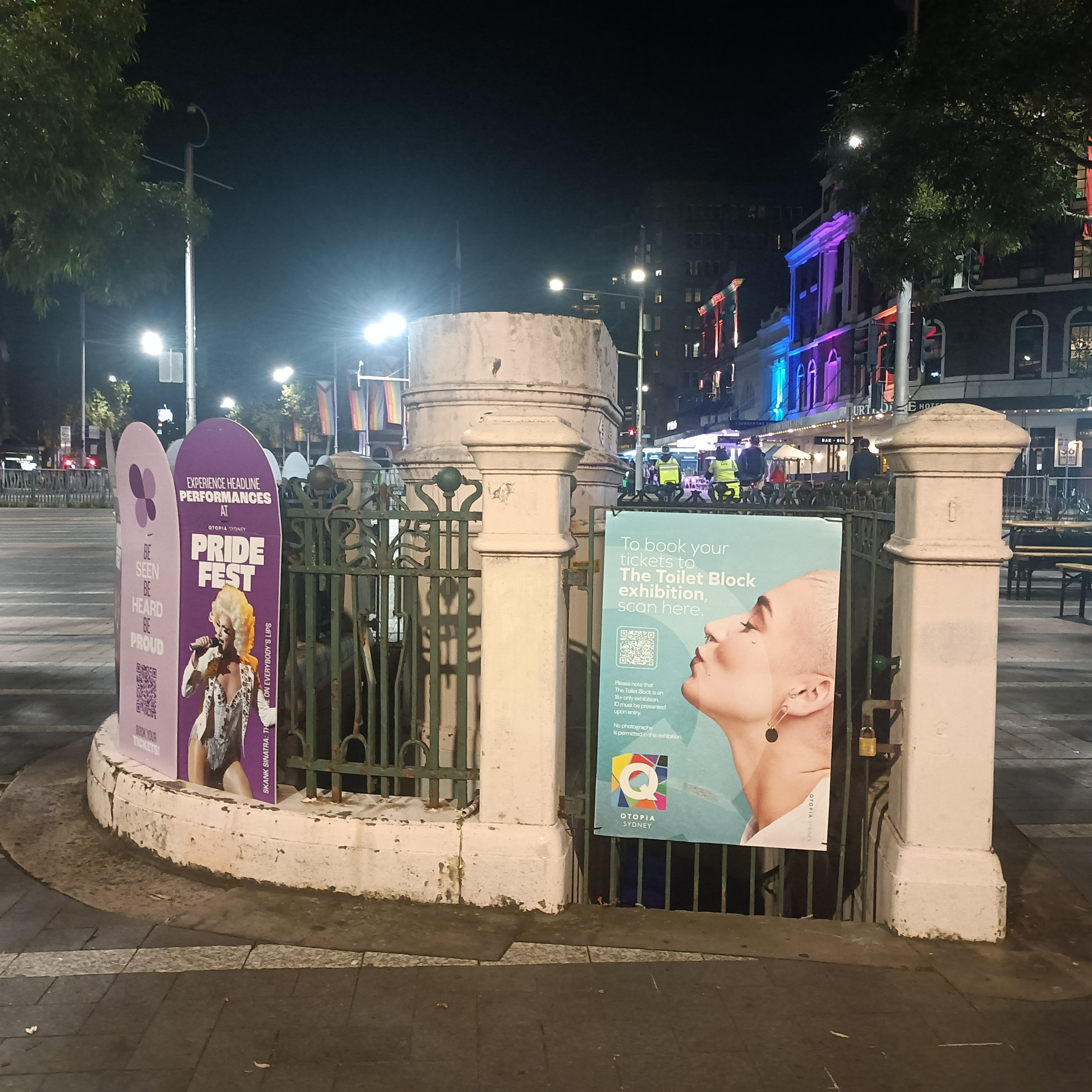
The entrance to the underground toilet block with stairs leading down to the toilets from the northern end of Taylor Square. The toilets were a popular place for people to randomly meet and have sex in Sydney for decades until its closure in 1998. In 2024 the toilet block became a part of Qtopia Sydney, a museum that has an extensive collection of objects related to queer culture in Sydney and the toilet block has hosted "exhibitions exploring Sydney's gay beat, sauna and cruising culture of the 1980s and 90s." 2025

An underground toilet block in Taylor Square, Sydney, was a popular spot for people to cruise for gay sex in Sydney.

The toilet block opened in 1907 and then closed in 1998 and in 2024 it became part of Qtopia Sydney, an LGBTQIA+ Museum that will "host adults-only exhibitions exploring Sydney's gay beat, sauna and cruising culture of the 1980s and 90s...".

Another popular gay cruising location used to exist in a public toilet block off Yarra Bend Road in Melbourne and it was commented in a 2012 article that "As a dutiful dog walker I have been an observer of the beat for a long time... ...In all the years I’ve been walking by, I have only seen this car park empty once... ...for the cruisers, at least those daytime subjects of my curiosity, are not chatty folk. Their language is a subtle one of glances and head-turns – I’ve never seen them converse. They pull into the car park, sometimes sit for a while, sometimes move straight to the toilets; there are always one or two lonely souls wandering the grass. The men size each other up continuously, hyper-alert to each new arrival. Some stay only briefly, others settle in for the afternoon. Cars come and go, all kinds of cars – muscle cars, tradesmen’s vans, family station wagons. The men are all kinds, too – young, old, business-suited, tracksuited... ...The busiest times are lunch and after dark – the narrow road becomes jammed."

=== Canada ===
In Canada, Hudson's Bay Company department stores were frequently used as cruising spots throughout the 1970s onwards. Arrests occurred throughout the 80s, with undercover police running sting operations in the stores.

Toronto gay cruising spots include the Marie Curtis Park, which has faced police stings in 1982 and 2016 and High Park where the Murder of Kenneth Zeller took place.

=== China ===
Cruising for gay sex was popular in China prior to the 1997 decriminalisation of same sex relationships. Although the use of cruising spaces has lowered since decriminalisation, they are still popular with members of the gay community. Urban parks are popular spots for cruising, with Dongdan Park in Beijing and People's Park (Guangzhou) often being frequented by gay men seeking sex.

=== United Kingdom ===
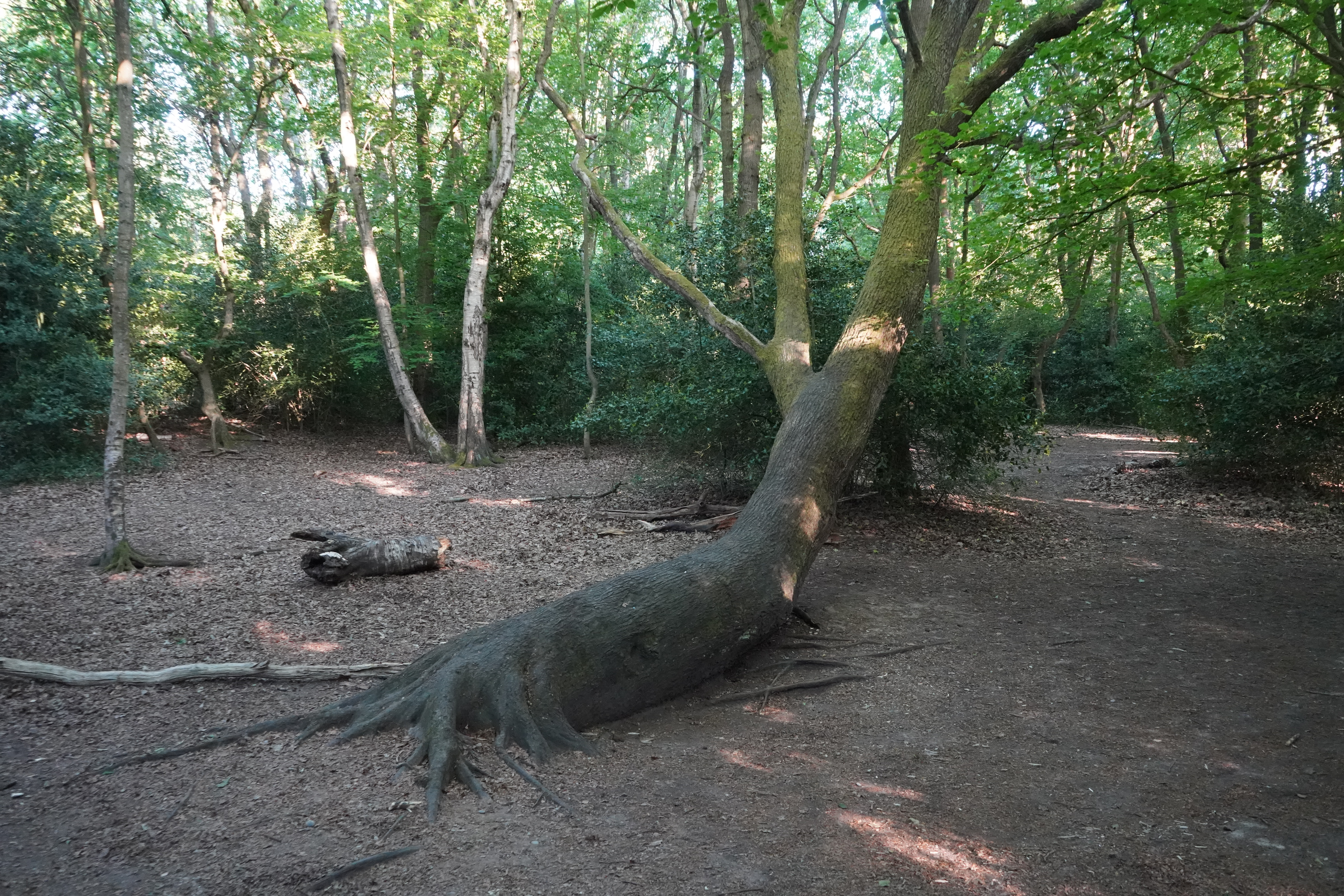
The Fuck Tree is located in Hampstead Heath, a park in Camden, London, that is a well known gay cruising area.

Hampstead Heath in north London has been described as "...the most popular cruising area in London" that has a long history of gay cruising going back to Victorian times. A notable site used for gay sex on the Heath is the Fuck Tree, which was the subject of anti-cruising protests in 2025 and in response ACT UP posted notices in the West Heath that included a sign that said "take me to the fuck tree". In 2023 it was commented that the "...'fuck tree', whose roots grow at an angle that positions its trunk very low to the ground... ...enables two — or even five — people to easily lie on top of it... ...so regularly do amorous heath-goers rub up and down against this beleaguered oak that sections of its bark have been buffed smooth.

In relation to what happens when a person is cruising on Hampstead Heath, it has been commented that "There's a lot of walking around involved in cruising. On the Heath, there's a sort of circuit and you can go round on your own or with a friend, though loud talking is frowned on as it seems to break the spell. Alternatively, you can sit on the sidelines and watch the circuit go past you. When you see someone you like, it's a case of eye-contact, move on, come back for more eye contact... ...When you have established that you're both interested, you move in... ...A raised eyebrow, a half-smile as you move in to touch a buttock, maybe, or the front of the jeans. If you've got it all wrong, two little pats on your arm politely get the "not interested" message over." The artist Trevor Yeung recreated the tree in soap at his 2023 exhibition Soft Ground at the Gasworks Gallery in Kennington, and it has been commented that "...Yeung has gathered litter from the site and strewn it across sections of the floor ("people don't think about recycling when they are horny," he says)... ...Yeung says that he has been to the Heath at least 20 times to observe the action, interview cruisers and scour the scene for human traces left behind. "It's like fishing, you sometimes have to wait and wait to catch something," he says.

George Michael has spoken about times that he has cruised for gay sex on Hampstead Heath, and in the 2007 Extras Christmas Special Michael appears in a scene which begins with Ricky Gervais's character, Andy Millman, sitting on a park bench on Hampstead Heath talking to a third character who is cruising for gay sex, and then ends with Michael leaving the bench and walking off into the Heath to cruise for sex in the bushes while a newspaper photographer then arrives looking for a photo and they are then told of Michael's hidden location inside the bushes by Andy Millman.

It has further been commented in relation to cruising on Hampstead Heath and in the UK that "...London is a cruisey city, with lots of places to choose from, each with its own personality and niche market. George Michael's choice, Hampstead Heath, remains the daddy of all cruising grounds. It's one of the most renowned in the world... Its visitors come from far and wide, though there's a whiff of the suburban about the cars in the parking lot. There can be hundreds of men up there - enjoying summer nights or gathered around bonfires in winter... ...but it isn't unique to the capital. Whether Kelvingrove in Glasgow, Gosforth Park in Newcastle, Bute Park in Cardiff or the Common in Southampton, almost all towns and cities have their own long-standing cruising grounds."

Clapham Common in south London is well known for gay cruising and the TV drama Clapham Junction was based around the lives of gay men in the area and included scenes of cruising and cottaging.

==== Legal status in the United Kingdom ====
The Sexual Offences Act 2003 prohibits all forms of sexual activity in a public lavatory, but has nothing to say about other forms of cruising. However, persons of any gender who engage in sexual intercourse in public can find themselves charged with offences under the Public Order Act 1986, if the police have sufficient evidence to convince a court of law that the activity was witnessed by a third party, or there was a high likelihood of the activity being witnessed by a third party.

In relation to a July 2006 News of the World story that alleged that George Michael had been having sex on Hampstead Heath, Michael commented that "...the absolutely normal thing to do, is to do it at two in the morning because... ...I've said I enjoy cruising and cruising now, if you cruise um, out of sight of the average individual or an individual who's not involved in that cruising then you are in, within the parameters of the law... ...the law has changed I'm, I'm with, well within, the law...". Whilst being interviewed for TV on BBC News 24 Michael has further described cruising as being "De facto" private, saying, that "...it's private that's the point what I was doing was private... ...I don't know anybody that actually goes to Hampstead Heath at two in the morning for anything other than the reason of playing about... ...If they are there at two in the morning then they're a little bit strange or they just don't know the local area...".

=== United States ===
Notable cruising locations include Silver Lake, Los Angeles, and White Point Garden.

In October 2025 over 200 people were arrested by Amtrak Police Department in a targeted enforcement against cruising in New York Penn Station. The bathroom was listed as a hotspot on the cruising app Sniffies. At least 20 men were confirmed to have been taken into United States Immigration and Customs Enforcement following their arrest.

== Regional usage variants ==
In the United States, the term "cruising" is used predominantly to denote exclusively homosexual behavior, but in Australia and the United Kingdom it is used by both homosexuals and heterosexuals to describe their own behavior, as witnessed in the common male heterosexual derivative phrase "cruising for chicks".

In the United States, cruising often takes place in gay bars, adult video arcades often through gloryholes, adult movie theaters, public toilets, parks, saunas, gyms or gay bathhouses. Engaging in such activities in public places like parks has led to participants being charged with indecent exposure.

In Poland, the term pikieta (plural: pikiety; translated as "picket" or "piquet") is used to describe a similar practice. Origination around the turn of the 19th century, pickets were especially popular during the Polish People's Republic period, when homosexuality was more taboo and few people decided to be open about their sexuality. In Warsaw, one of the most prominent locations for pickets was the northern frontage of Three Crosses Square. In the early 21st century, pickets became less popular due to the development of a network of premises for sexual minorities, such as bars, discos and saunas, as well as communication via the Internet. Polish theatrical, cabaret, and silent film actor and singer Karol Hanusz was murdered in his apartment by a man he picked up while cruising.

== George Michael ==
The music video for the song "Outside" by George Michael satirises the events that occurred during his April 1998 arrest in a public toilet in Los Angeles. In 2004 he commented that "I do think I was set up between Fleet Street and the Beverly Hills Police Force. I'm absolutely convinced... ...I found out things in the week after that arrest that totally suggest that there was corrupt, major corruption going on."

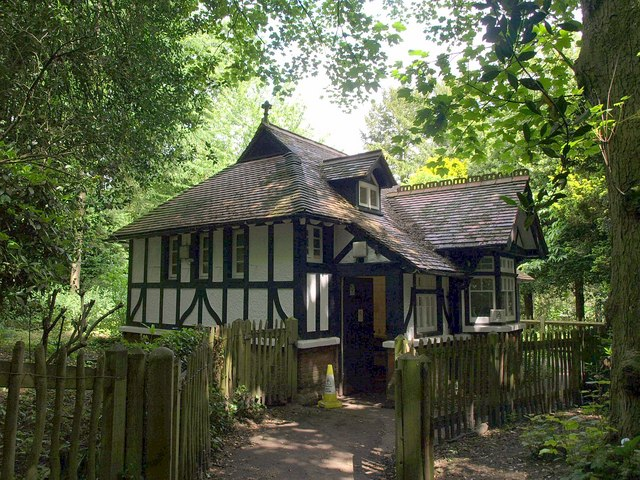
Public toilets on Hampstead Heath, which has been described as "...the most popular cruising area in London" that has a long history of gay cruising going back to the 18th century. In response to a 2006 News of the World story alleging that George Michael had sex on Hampstead Heath, Michael responded "I went out last Tuesday night and uh, came off of Hampstead Heath, I don't even remember if I got any action right,... ...I don't suppose this will be much of a story. Which I don't suppose it would have been without the addition of a completely fabricated encounter... ." Photo taken 2013

=== Cruising for sex ===
The British popstar George Michael began cruising for gay sex when he was 16 and in an interview in 2004 he commented that, "When I made the "Outside" video I knew I was helping a whole generation of 15-year-olds who are cruising and dying of shame about it. I felt that lightening the stigma around cruising was the most immediately beneficial thing I could do. I know for a fact that when I was 16, 17, when I started cruising, that watching the ‘Outside’ video would have taken some of the weight off my shoulders."

Michael further went on to comment that cruising for gay sex was something that he had done throughout his entire life, "...that's the wonderful thing about cruising. The vast majority of men were either married or in the closet. So you have a mutual secret and that's pretty watertight... ...If you're a suburban cruiser like my good self and you like guys that are really straight-acting, then most of the people you pick up... ...are not going to tell your secret because they've got one themselves. I mean, fuck, it worked for years. Interviewer: Was there a moment when people would double-take and realise it was you? Michael: I think probably most of them did. Sometimes we'd talk about it afterwards and have a laugh...".

Michael also commented that having gay sex while cruising was one of the ways he was able to meet new people "One of the things about cruising and having a secret sex life for so long is that... ...it meant that I was constantly meeting ordinary people... ...And I still believe that with the people I meet for sex. It's nowhere near as regular as it was but I constantly meet new people via people that I know are cool and I can trust. When you meet somebody, see them a few times, and basically say, ‘who do you know that's cool and tasty with a big knob?’ [laughing] and I meet people all the time that way."

On 19 September 2008, Michael was arrested inside the South End Green underground toilets just over 100 metres from Hampstead Heath station and the southern end of Hampstead Heath. He was found to be in possession of Class A and Class C drugs and was taken to the police station and cautioned for controlled substance possession. In 2009 he discussed what occurred in an interview with the Guardian, "Interviewer: 'And did you have crack with you then?' George Michael: 'No, that wasn't any, that wasn't the car thing. That was another little sexual, that was one of my little sexual things. Anything to do with cruising I don't give a shit really what people think, really... ...you know I've sex in the wong places and they don't agree with my geography when it comes to sex I really don't give a shit...'. Interviewer: '...Were you smoking crack?' Michael: 'Was I? On that occasion? Yeah. You know I didn’t go in there with it. I just said yes as they...' [...said yes as they were doing it in the South End Green underground toilets.]".

=== 1998 arrest in a public toilet in Los Angeles ===
On 6 April 1998 Michael was arrested for "engaging in a lewd act" in a public toilet in Los Angeles. Michael commented in a November 1998 MTV interview that "I got followed into the restroom and then this cop — I didn't know it was a cop, obviously — he started playing this game, which I think is called, 'I'll show you mine, you show me yours, and then when you show me yours, I'm going to nick you!'... ...Actually, what happened was once he got an eyeful, he walked past me, straight past me and out, and I thought, that's kind of odd. I thought, maybe he's just not impressed. And then I went to walk back to my car, and as I got back to the car, I was arrested on the street. ... If someone's waving their genitalia at you, you don't automatically assume that they're an officer of the law...". Whilst on the Late Show with David Letterman Michael commented that "...actually the police report said that he was simulating urination... ...if you tried to simulate urination doing that with your hand you'd get wee all over the shop is all I can say." Michael further commented on Letterman that "...the police are not allowed to do something illegal in order to make you do something illegal, you know, it was definite entrapment."

Michael was not obligated to attend the court hearing in person which he did not do and he pleaded "no contest" to the charge in court and was given an $810 fine and ordered to do 80 hours of community service and Michael commented that "...normally if you pay your fine you don't do community service but I'm doing community service which is yet to be arranged but I will do it...".

Michael also commented that he had "...been given, twice the probation people normally get..." which was a 2-year probation period and that he was ordered to participate in sex therapy and was given double the penalty that would normally be given in such a circumstance. He also commented that the judge said he would "...throw me in jail next time" if he did it again and that the toilet in the music video for "Outside" was not the same as the one he was arrested at as he was "...not allowed to go back there...".

Later on in 1998 Michael satirised the events that occurred during his arrest in Los Angeles in the music video for the song "Outside" and he was sued by one of the officers who originally arrested him for portraying him as non-heterosexual and mocking him. The suit was ultimately dismissed.

Michael has commented in relation to his arrest on MTV in 2004 that "It was definitely set up, but, on top of the setup, I was like one of the people setting myself up, you know, they only had to do two thirds of the work...". In a 2004 TV interview for Danish Television he commented that "I do think I was set up between Fleet Street and the Beverly Hills Police Force. I'm absolutely convinced that there was serious corruption going on. And I found out things in the week after that arrest that totally suggest that there was corrupt, major corruption going on." In a 1998 TV interview in the Netherlands Michael commented, "...the actual arrest, the arrest itself was illegal so the video is my perfect opportunity. I mean, I might not be able to tell people exactly what happened but I can at least say, 'look, one I can laugh about it... Interviewer: You were arrested for disorderly conduct, how disorderly was it? Michael: Well it was no, no more or less disorderly than the policeman involved, put it that way." In a 2012 LBC radio interview Michael also commented that "I mean I promise you the day that I got arrested in, in Los Angeles...the day that that happened, because it was all organized between, um, the News of the World and the, or the Sun, and the, the LA police. Believe me, it was a setup, right?...But the day that they actually succeeded in outing me, the Sun newspaper closed down for the afternoon and had a party."

In an MTV interview in November 1998 it was commented to Michael that after his arrest in Los Angeles earlier that year, that he and his partner Kenny Goss were still together, with Michael responding "...I'm not saying I have an open relationship with my boyfriend but he knows who I am. He knows that you know, I'm generally oversexed, so, so he's been very very good...". In an interview in July 2002 Michael further commented that "...maybe because I'm, I'm stupid enough to be honest about the fact that I'm not monogamous. Uh, I'm in a long-term relationship. Um, I've been together with my partner for six years. We're in our seventh year... ...We're not monogamous. We live the way many gay couples do...".

Michael further commented in 2004 on Danish television on the way he was publicly outed in Los Angeles, "...it's funny though, I don't,.. ...I don't really even look back and think what was I thinking or regret it because so much good stuff came out of that for me personally, that uh, you know laughable though it is, it doesn't bother me in the slightest."

=== Hampstead Heath story in a 2006 edition of the News of the World ===
In July 2006 the News of the World published a story that alleged that Michael had been having sex at Hampstead Heath in London on the 18th of that month. Whilst being interviewed for TV on BBC News 24 shortly after the News of the World story was published, Michael commented that he had "..never ever seen let alone wanted to have any kind of sexual encounter with..." the individual the News of the World alleged that Michael had sex with.

On 27 July 2006 Michael commented further that "I went out last Tuesday night and uh, came off of Hampstead Heath, I don't even remember if I got any action right,... ...and my car was parked right by the public foot, footpath off of Hampstead Heath, or one of them, because I have nothing to hide. I don't worry about people seeing my car there you know, I walked straight off a public pathway on my own... ...[There were] two photographers who have been tailing me for the best part of six months, almost 24 hours a day... ...went home... ...I don't suppose this will be much of a of a story. Which I don't suppose it would have been without the addition of a completely fabricated encounter with I suppose a very deliberately chosen very unattractive man in order to try and somehow turn... ...[it] into some act of desperation, you know."

Michael has further commented that "...the absolutely normal thing to do, is to do it at two in the morning because... ...if you cruise um out of sight of the average individual or an individual who's not involved in that cruising then you are in, within the parameters of the law..." Michael also commented that "...there are people able legally to follow me around 24 hours a day... ...as long as they have cameras, that to me is the issue,...". During the BBC News 24 interview Michael further described his gay cruising as being de facto private, saying, "...it's private that's the point, what I was doing was private... ...I don't know anybody that actually goes to Hampstead Heath at two in the morning for anything other than the reason of playing about... ...If they are there at two in the morning then they're a little bit strange or they just don't know the local area...".

In a 2009 interview with Michael the interviewer commented that "The perception of you is someone... ...You have a nice house here, you can pop up have a bit of a cruise on the Heath..." with Michael responding "...I can a handful of times, you know a handful of times a year that it's bloody warm enough I'll do it, and you know, um and do it without reservation. It's a really nice summer evening. Quite often there are campfires up there...". Later on in 1998, after George Michael had been arrested in Los Angeles Boy George commented that "I think it was really a lot of fuss about nothing really. I mean, I think it's okay to have sex in public places. I live on Hampstead Heath. Everybody does it up there."

== In popular culture ==
Cruising for sex is alluded to in songs such as "Cruisin' the Streets" by the Boys Town Gang as well as "I'm a Cruiser" by the Village People, on the album titled Cruisin'.

In 1980, director William Friedkin made the film Cruising, starring Al Pacino. The film introduced many audiences to homosexual activities and the linguistic codes used for them, but gay rights groups perceived a negative depiction of the gay community in the film and protested its production.

Cruising features prominently in the storylines of Joe Pitt and Louis Ironson in Tony Kushner's 1991 play about the AIDS crisis in New York City, Angels in America, as well as its 2003 miniseries adaptation by HBO. The miniseries specifically depicts the popular cruising location of The Ramble alongside other locations in Central Park.

The opening scene of the first episode of the HBO series Looking involves the main character Patrick (Jonathan Groff) cruising in a park, mainly out of curiosity as to whether the activity is still in practice or not.

Cruising for sex was explored in Cruising Pavilion, a 2018 art installation associated with the Venice Biennale of Architecture.

The Fuck Tree, a tree in a gay cruising area on Hampstead Heath in north London, has been the subject of artworks by Liz Rosenfeld and Trevor Yeung.

== See also ==
- Cottaging
- Cruisin' (album)
- Dogging (sexual slang)
- Gay bathhouse
- Gay beat
- Gay cruising in Australia
- Gay cruising in England and Wales
- Glory hole
- Homosocialization
- Nudity and sexuality
- Sexuality and space
- Sniffies
- Squirt.org
- Troll (gay)
