= Sex with a Stranger =

- DVD released by Gourmet Video
- Directed by: Chris Monte
- Written by: Cash Markman; Chad Randolph
- Produced by: Chris Monte
- Starring: Keisha; Scott Irish; Greg Derek; Ebony Ayes; Nina Hartley; Randy West; Sheena Horne
- Edited by: "Hal 9000"
- Music by: Hugh Wambly; Mobus Wambly
- Distributed by: Adult Video Corporation
- Release date: October 1, 1986 (United States)
- Running time: 79 minutes
- Country: United States
- Language: English

Sex with a Stranger is a 1986 pornographic horror film directed by Chris Monte and written by Cash Markman and Chad Randolph.

== Plot ==
A group of seven seemingly unconnected people each receive a letter containing half of a thousand dollar bill, an invitation to a mansion, and the promise of money and prizes if they show up. Arriving at the house, the recipients of the envelopes find a note, which informs them that rooms have been prepared for them, and that their host (known only as "J.M.") will arrive soon to explain everything to them. The guests conclude that they have been called together due to a tontine made by relatives, who all died in a hotel fire during their last annual meeting.

Trevor and Priscilla have sex in a bedroom, and Joy and Inspector #6 (who was in the midst of donning women's undergarments when Joy walked in on him) do the same elsewhere. Afterward, the inspector is killed when he falls or is shoved down a flight of stairs, and his body disappears shortly after the others find it. Wanting to know who summoned them, and in need of the money they have been promised, the remaining guests decide to stay despite the risk of being murdered.

Slick and Sugar go off to have sex, and Priscilla is found dead, having been electrocuted while using a sabotaged vibrator. Thinking Priscilla's automatic camera could offer a clue as to what happened to her, Slick and Sugar try to develop the film in it, while Trevor mourns Priscilla's death by downing a glass of wine, which has been spiked with rodenticide. Joy coerces Doctor Rivameter into having sex on the bed containing Priscilla and Trevor's bodies, but they are interrupted mid-coitus by screams coming from another room.

Rivameter discovers that Sugar has been drowned in a sink, and as she and Joy conclude that the killer must be Slick, he stumbles into the room with a spike through his head, and a knife in his back. Slick drops dead before he can reveal his killer, but then he instantly recovers, and it is revealed that he and all the other victims were not actually dead. The inspector had merely been knocked out by an accidental fall down the stairs, and the others had faked their deaths to stop themselves from being targeted by the nonexistent killer.

Jacob Myers, the man who called everyone to the mansion, enters the room, and introduces himself as the attorney handling the tontine case. Myers states that all that is left of the tontine is the thousand dollar bills he sent to the inheritors to get them there, the rest of the money having been lost on a failed investment in liquid prophylactics. Joy follows Myers to his bedroom, and the others decide to pass the time until daylight by having an orgy.

== Cast ==
- Ebony Ayes as Sugar, a high class prostitute.
- Greg Derek as Trevor Fairbanks, an actor.
- Nina Hartley as Priscilla Vogue, a fashion model.
- Sheena Horne as Joy, a ditz with a fetish for anonymous sex.
- Scott Irish as Inspector #6, a clothing inspector.
- Keisha as Rivameter, a Doctor of Philosophy.
- Randy West as Sylvester "Slick" Rhodes, a shyster.

== Reception ==
Adam Film World gave the film a three out of five, marking it as "Hot". AVN stated that while it was "a technically-sound production that features a capable cast" it was brought down by a ridiculous and overwrought plot, and mostly lukewarm sex.

A one and a half was awarded by Popcorn for Breakfast, which called Sex with a Stranger "painfully derivative" and "a poster child for bad porn" before concluding "As a curiosity, it may have some archival value in that it's about as tasteless as mainstream porn gets in places". A two out of five was given by The Bloody Pit of Horror, which wrote "It's cheap (and shot-on-video, naturally), silly, has a few dumb laughs and there's lots of sex, so mission accomplished, I guess".
