= Fuck tree =

Tree in Hampstead Heath, London, England

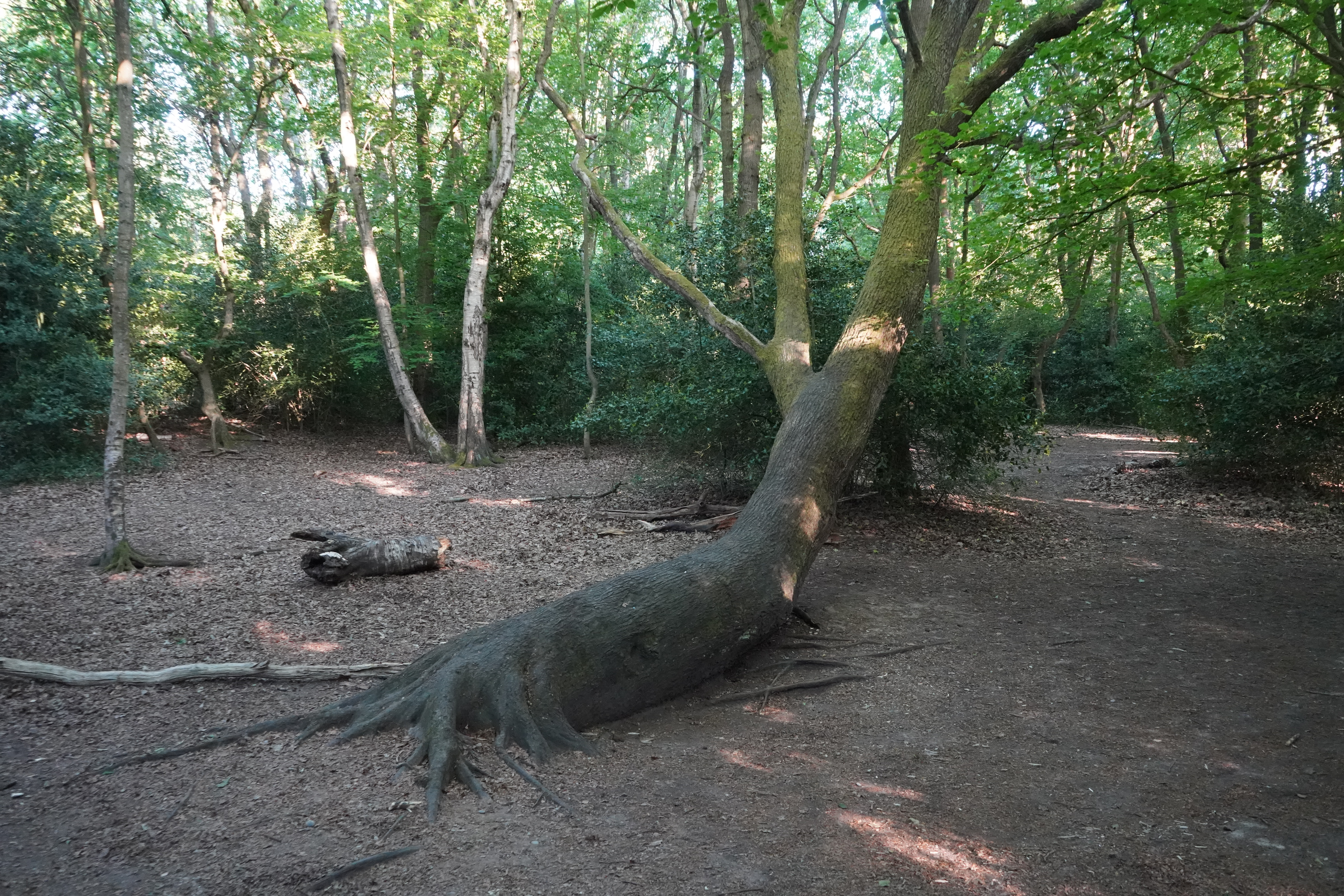
- The fuck tree in 2025
- Interactive map of Fuck tree
- Species: Sessile oak (Quercus petraea)
- Location: Hampstead Heath, in the London Borough of Camden
- Coordinates: 51°33′53″N 0°11′11″W
- Custodian: City of London Corporation

The fuck tree is a sessile oak tree on West Heath on Hampstead Heath in north London. It is located in an established gay cruising area. It is noted for its prostrate trunk, which facilitates gay sex.

== History ==
Bron Maher visited the tree in October 2023 for The Fence, a British satirical magazine. He described it as having managed to "elude public consciousness" and described it as "... poetically perfect for its role. The roots of the tree splay out like a hand clutching a bed sheet; the trunk is prone and abdomen-high, its belly flat to the Heath floor before making an abrupt 45-degree lift toward the canopy. This tree, I tell you, has a slutty little back arch".

The tree was described in Armistead Maupin's 2024 novel Mona of the Manor. The character Wilfred visits the tree while cruising for sex. Maupin writes that the tree "stood in a clearing bordered by dark thickets on all sides. The trunk of the tree swooped so low to the ground that it became a chaise against which you could lean for wanking or bend over to be fucked".

A 2025 ACT UP protest against anti-cruising notices in West Heath included a sign that said "take me to the fuck tree".

In 2025, an article in the Daily Telegraph said that the Heath has been used for cruising since Victorian times.

== In art ==
The 2017 art film Fuck Tree by performance artist Liz Rosenfeld was created as a portrait of the fuck tree and as a response to the 1989 film Sodom by Luther Price. Rosenfeld subsequently soaked parts of the film in their own ejaculate to erode its image and buried it in the garden of the art gallery LUX. Rosenfeld's film has been described as examining "queer dystopia, a positive embrace of apocalypse, invisible genocide, and queer life after queer death".

The artist Trevor Yeung created a soap sculpture of the tree at his 2023 exhibition Soft Ground at the Gasworks Gallery in Kennington. Yeung described the tree as "a physical embodiment of desire, that most enigmatic of feelings" and a monument to "human interactions". It was also commented that "...Yeung has gathered litter from the site and strewn it across sections of the floor ("people don't think about recycling when they are horny," he says)... ...Yeung says that he has been to the Heath at least 20 times to observe the action, interview cruisers and scour the scene for human traces left behind. "It's like fishing, you sometimes have to wait and wait to catch something," he says.

== See also ==
- Gay cruising in England and Wales
- List of individual trees
- Great Trees of London – List of trees in London
