= One-night stand =

Brief sexual relationship

A one-night stand is a single sexual encounter in which there is no expectation of further sexual relations between the participants. It is a form of casual sex, and is generally distinguished from other casual sexual relationships by its occurring on a single occasion. The term originally referred to a single night performance by an entertainer or theatrical company at a venue before moving on to another engagement. The sexual sense of the term has been recorded as being in use since the 1930s. The practice has also been described as "sexual activity without emotional commitment or future involvement".

== Research ==
Research indicates that one-night stands occur in varied circumstances, with nightlife and social gatherings as common settings. A 2026 international study of 1,044 people reporting on their most recent one-night stand, 55% had met their sexual partner the same day, 11% had met them relatively recently, and the remaining 34% had known the person for a longer period. 60% of encounters occurred after a party or small social gathering, 15% after a date, 13% after a date arranged specifically for sex, and 8% after a chance encounter. A qualitative study of 104 young Norwegian participants in the nighttime economy found that alcohol fueled sexual exploration settings like parties, festivals, bars, and holidays contributed to the circumstances in which one-night stands developed. Both immediate sexual pleasure and the later social pleasure of recounting the experience were important aspects of participant experiences. A study of sexual scripts in Portuguese young adults found that physical attraction was a recurring motivation for one-night stands. Participants typically envisioned absence of advance planning, with the act developing through face-to-face expressions of sexual interest and flirting.

Prevalence of one-night stands varies by population and demographics. A 2023 Envie survey of more than 10,000 people aged 18–29 in France found that 21% reported having had at least one one-night stand during the preceding 12 months. Men reported one-night stands more frequently than women in each age group examined. For people aged 18–21, 27% of men and 18% of women reported at least one during the preceding year; for those aged 22–25, the figures were 29% and 16%, respectively; and for those aged 26–29, the figures were 21% and 13%. One-night stands were more frequently reported by respondents with parents in higher-level occupations. This was particularly so among women.

== Views ==
While most participants in one-night stands are single people not currently in relationships, for those who are in relationships, the one-night stand is the most common form of infidelity, and is often used in research, polls and surveys to define the level of promiscuity in a society at any given time. It has been suggested that such an act can be as threatening to a relationship as a long-term affair:

A one-night stand can be more dangerous than finding a lover with mutual considerations. This scenario is good for the business traveler who has the odds in his or her favor; however, it is very important to know with whom you are getting into bed, even for just one night. No one should be exempt from causing you a problem, no matter the distance or circumstance. A one-night stand is still a form of infidelity and can be just as damaging for you and your partner if discovered.

Some women have suggested that women who feel sexually insecure or unfulfilled should seek out one-night stands for personal growth and fulfillment. One writes, "[a] one-night stand is the erotic manifestation of carpe diem— only we are seizing the night instead of the day". Another source advises women seeking empowerment to "jumpstart your heyday by having a one-night stand", and clarifies that the one-night stand should be a conscious decision.

The prevalence of one-night stands has been abetted by the advent of online dating apps such as Tinder and Grindr, which allow people to connect for purposes including sexual encounters, although these tools can also be used to seek longer-term relationship partners.

A review in Psychology Today reported that: "Participants who had one-night stands reported experiencing more emotional than sexual connection. Helen Fisher (2014) found that about 27% of those who had one-night stands testified that their experiences turned into long-term relationships.

== Further relations ==
Relationship therapist Laura Berman suggests that the circumstances that lead to such an encounter do not necessarily preclude a later relationship:

Certainly, having sex on a first date can be a death knell if your partner decides that a one-night stand is all he is after. On the other hand, many happy couples broke that rule of no sex on the first date and have been together for years.

In contrast to a one-night stand, if the individuals involved have recurrent sexual contact without romantic involvement, that is considered a casual sexual relationship.

The one-night stand may also be simulated as a form of sexual roleplay, by people already in an established relationship. Partners may meet at a bar or hotel, pretending not to know one another and adopting the roles of strangers, flirt as though meeting for the first time, and enact a "one-night stand" before returning to their normal lives and sexual routines.

== See also ==
- Anonymous sex
- Cottaging
- Group sex
- Hookup culture
- Promiscuity
- Quickie (sexual act)
- Sociosexuality
- Sexual revolution
