= Gay cruising in England and Wales =

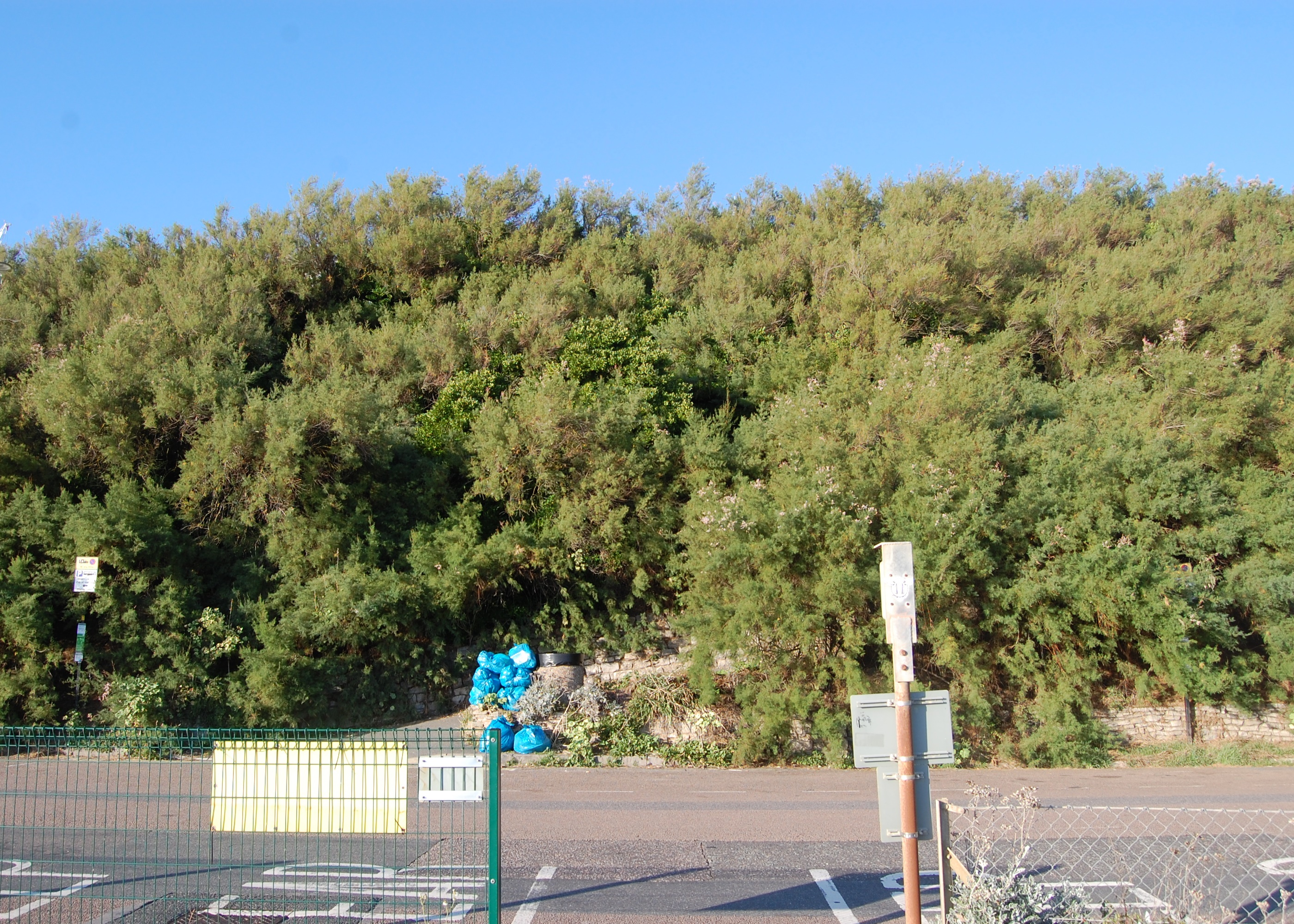
Outdoor spaces with significant vegetation cover, such as Duke's Mound in Brighton pictured here, are favoured sites for cruising. 2018

Gay cruising describes the act of searching about a public place in pursuit of a partner for sex. This activity has existed in England and Wales since at least the 17th century and has a colourful legal history. It differs from prostitution in that the parties involved do not seek money for sex, and from gay nightclubs or bathhouses in that they are not on private premises, although they may take place on private land to which the public have been granted access.

== History and origins ==
In the United Kingdom, gay cruising came about due to the illegality of homosexual acts prior to the Sexual Offences Act 1967, and this illegality meant that many gay men could not live openly as homosexuals. Cruising provided a way for gay men to solicit sexual encounters while minimizing the risk of being caught by the police. When cruising first became known, it usually took place in public fields, parks, toilets and theatres were also sometimes denounced as cruising grounds by moralists of the time. In the 20th century sex in public toilets in the UK became known as "cottaging" and the toilets where sex occurred were referred to as "cottages". Public toilets located next to highways, main roads or rural roads have also become popular cruising sites.

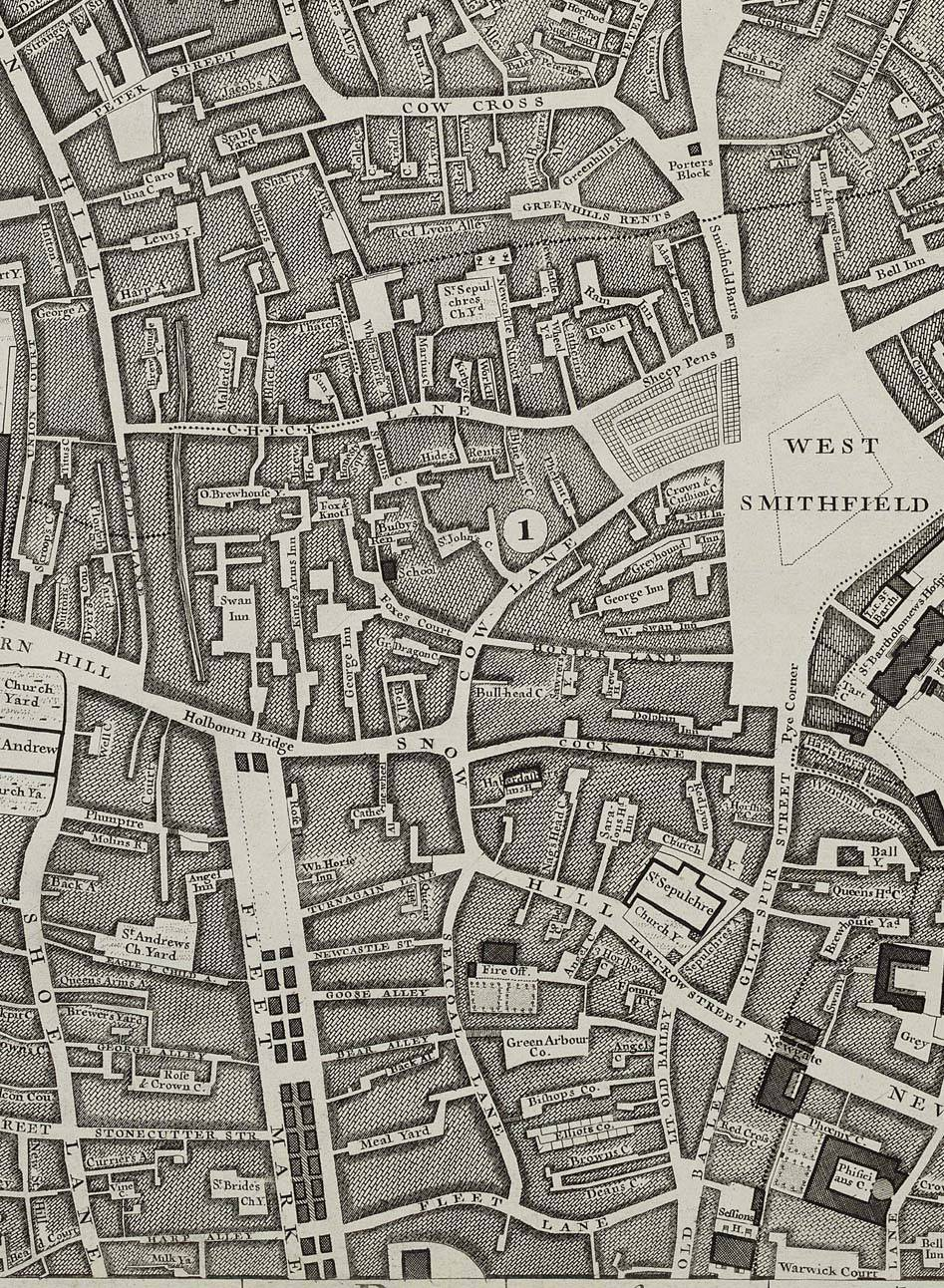
Mother Clap's molly-house was located in Field Lane, Holborn and can be seen on the left side of the map above. Mother Clap's molly-house was the most well known illegal gay brothel in 18th century London and had been open from 1724 to 1726, when a raid sustained by the Societies for the Reformation of Manners had it dismantled and 40 gay men who were present at the molly-house at the time of the raid were taken to Newgate prison where most were eventually set free, although those who weren't were either fined, imprisoned, exhibited in the pillory and three were hanged. Rocque Map of London, 1746.

The illegality of gay sex has meant that the history of gay cruising is sparsely documented, as those who used such cruising grounds were likely to be discreet about them. Rictor Norton, author of Mother Clap's Molly House the title of which is a reference to Margaret Clap's illegal gay brothel known as a "Molly House", believes that the first gay cruising grounds and gay brothels in London may have sprung up in the early 17th century and going from the earliest known records they may have originated even earlier in the late 1600s although they most likely originated much earlier than the 1600s. Mother Clap's molly-house was the most well known of these illegal gay brothels in 18th century London and it had been open from 1724 to 1726, when a raid sustained by the Societies for the Reformation of Manners had it dismantled and 40 gay men who were present at the molly-house at the time of the raid were taken to Newgate prison where most were eventually set free, although those who weren't were either fined, imprisoned, exhibited in the pillory and three were hanged.

Author Mark Turner comments that evidence of gay cruising goes back to at least the 18th century and has commented that "From St James's Park in the 18th century to Hampstead Heath today, gay men have always gone cruising in search of sex... ...Cruising is nothing new. It's been going on for hundreds of years, and its history is a part of the history of our cities and public spaces. As cities grew and populations became more anonymous, new opportunities for chance encounters arose, for straight and queer people alike... By night, teenagers hop fences to snog, hookers and rent boys ply their trade, lovers admire the moon, addicts shoot up, and gay men fuck... ...George Michael is right to drop his pants and lay claim to his queer culture - to a history of urban sexual adventure and misadventure that is as old and perverse as the parks themselves." Turner has further commented that in "Thomas Gilbert's 'A View of the Town' from the 18th century, a man leaves his wife in their bridal bed, sneaks off to St James's Park, 'roams in search of some vile ingle prize' and 'courts the foul pathick in the fair one's place'... ...such queer encounters in parks, on embankments, in toilets, streets and back alleys are an integral part of the way our cities - and sexualities - express themselves. Where there is public space, there will be diverse appropriations of it, and so it should be.

A Gay beat is an Australian term for a gay cruising ground.

=== Legal history ===
Before the 20th century, anal sex, whether conducted in public or private, was illegal under sodomy laws, including the Buggery Act set down by Henry VIII in 1533. The penalty for anal intercourse during most of this period was death; however, specific proof of successful anal penetration was required for this verdict to be brought. The lesser crime of "gross indecency" carried penalties including the pillory (as in the case of the Vere Street Coterie, who were arrested in a raid of a gay club in 1811), transportation and imprisonment.

The death penalty for anal sex was lifted in 1861. An 1885 law prohibited "gross indecency", which included all erotic conduct between men. Eventually, in 1967, some of the Wolfenden Report's recommendations of a decade earlier led to the decriminalisation of homosexual sex in private; no such legal privilege pertains to sex in public places, either for homosexual or heterosexual sex. Therefore, despite more tolerance in the law and society at large, gay men have continued to be at risk of prosecution for public sex.

A number of well known people have been arrested for sex in public places in England and Wales, including:

- Simeon Solomon, a painter who was arrested in a London toilet in 1873 with a 60-year-old stableman. He was also later arrested in France for a similar offence.
- Tom Driberg, later an MP, who was charged with indecent assault after two men shared his bed in the 1940s. He later used his position as a journalist several times to get off charges when caught soliciting in public toilets by the police.
- Actor Wilfrid Brambell, known for appearing in Steptoe and Son, was arrested in a toilet in Shepherd's Bush on 6 November 1962.
- Peter Dudley, an actor in Coronation Street who played Ivy Tilsley's husband, was arrested in 1981 in a toilet in Didsbury, Manchester.
- Actor John Gielgud was arrested for "importuning" in 1953 in Chelsea, London.
- William J. Field, (Member of Parliament), was arrested for persistently importuning in a public toilet in 1953. Field appealed against the conviction twice but failed on both occasions.
- Record producer Joe Meek, arrested in a toilet in Islington in 1963.
- Michael Turnbull was arrested in Hull for cottaging in a public toilet in 1968, before he became Bishop of Durham.
- Actor Peter Wyngarde, arrested (under his real name, Cyril Louis Goldbert) in Gloucester bus station public toilets in September 1975 for gross indecency with Richard Jack Whalley. He was fined £75.
- Stedman Pearson of the pop group Five Star, arrested in a toilet in New Malden in 1990.

The playwright Joe Orton wrote in his posthumously published diaries of his regular cottaging, but he did not incur prosecution.

=== Areas with a history of gay cruising ===
==== London ====
Norton (2007) lists a number of London cruising grounds during the Georgian era. These included St. James's Park, Moorfields, the public privies at Lincoln's Inn, and Smithfield prior to the Gordon Riots.

Hampstead Heath in north London has been described as "...the most popular cruising area in London" that has a long history of gay cruising going back to Victorian times. Popstar George Michael has spoken about times that he has cruised for gay sex on Hampstead Heath, and in a 2009 interview with Michael the interviwer commented that "The perception of you is someone... ...You have a nice house here, you can pop up have a bit of a cruise on the Heath..." with Michael responding "...I can a handful of times, you know a handful of times a year that it's bloody warm enough I'll do it, and you know, um and do it without reservation. It's a really nice summer evening. Quite often there are campfires up there...".

In the 2007 Extras Christmas Special George Michael appears in a scene which begins with Ricky Gervais's character, Andy Millman, sitting on a park bench on Hampstead Heath talking to a third character who is cruising for gay sex, and then ends with Michael leaving the bench and walking off into the Heath to cruise for sex in the bushes while a newspaper photographer then arrives looking for a photo and they are then told of Michael's hidden location inside the bushes by Andy Millman.

In April 1998 George Michael was arrested for "engaging in a lewd act" in a public toilet in Los Angeles and later that year Boy George commented that "I think it was really a lot of fuss about nothing really. I mean, I think it's okay to have sex in public places. I live on Hampstead Heath. Everybody does it up there."

A notable site used for gay sex on the Heath is the Fuck Tree, which was the subject of anti-cruising protests in 2025 and in response ACT UP posted notices in the West Heath that included a sign that said "take me to the fuck tree". In 2023 it was commented that the "...'fuck tree', whose roots grow at an angle that positions its trunk very low to the ground... ...enables two — or even five — people to easily lie on top of it... ...so regularly do amorous heath-goers rub up and down against this beleaguered oak that sections of its bark have been buffed smooth. Cruising on Hampstead Heath has been accompanied by police arrests and attacks and from the late 1990s, this evolved into minimal active policing, and support from gay sexual health organisations. In 1992, Conservative MP Alan Amos resigned his parliamentary seat after he was found by the police "engaging in a homosexual act" on the Heath.

In relation to what happens when a person is cruising on Hampstead Heath it has been commented that "There's a lot of walking around involved in cruising. On the Heath, there's a sort of circuit and you can go round on your own or with a friend, though loud talking is frowned on as it seems to break the spell. Alternatively, you can sit on the sidelines and watch the circuit go past you. When you see someone you like, it's a case of eye-contact, move on, come back for more eye contact...When you have established that you're both interested, you move in...A raised eyebrow, a half-smile as you move in to touch a buttock, maybe, or the front of the jeans. If you've got it all wrong, two little pats on your arm politely get the "not interested" message over." The artist Trevor Yeung recreated the tree in soap at his 2023 exhibition Soft Ground at the Gasworks Gallery in Kennington, and it has been commented that "...Yeung has gathered litter from the site and strewn it across sections of the floor ("people don't think about recycling when they are horny," he says)... ...Yeung says that he has been to the Heath at least 20 times to observe the action, interview cruisers and scour the scene for human traces left behind. "It's like fishing, you sometimes have to wait and wait to catch something," he says.

It has been commented further that "London is a cruisey city, with lots of places to choose from, each with its own personality and niche market. George Michael's choice, Hampstead Heath, remains the daddy of all cruising grounds. It's one of the most renowned in the world... ...Its visitors come from far and wide, though there's a whiff of the suburban about the cars in the parking lot. There can be hundreds of men up there - enjoying summer nights or gathered around bonfires in winter... ...The tendency, however, has been to clamp down on cruising in London. Russell Square, the queerest patch until they began locking it up at night several years ago, also attracted a diverse, though mostly youngish, set - students and lecturers from nearby colleges; merry office workers out on the town; gay guys from the bars and clubs in Soho... ...When they closed it the action swiftly moved south to Bloomsbury Square, creating a more intimate, even bijou cruising ground that was policed heavily at first and eventually closed at night. Where the locals now walk their dogs at night is anyone's guess."

Clapham Common in south London is also well known for gay cruising. The Labour MP Ron Davies resigned from the government after national newspapers reported that he was attacked and robbed by a man whom he met on the Common. A number of homophobic attacks have occurred around the area, including the murder of Jody Dobrowski. The gay-themed TV drama Clapham Junction was based around the lives of gay men in the area and included scenes of cruising and cottaging.

It has been commented that "London's outdoor cruising scene remains varied and vibrant, but it isn't unique to the capital. Whether Kelvingrove in Glasgow, Gosforth Park in Newcastle, Bute Park in Cardiff or the Common in Southampton, almost all towns and cities have their own long-standing cruising grounds."

==== Brighton ====
Duke's Mound in Brighton, locally known as "The Bushes" is well known for cruising; the quarter-mile strip located next to the nudist beach has long had a reputation as one of the most active cruising areas in the UK, both due to the city's large LGBT population as well as the 4 to 6 metre tall tamarisk bushes that shielded the winding path from public view. However, in 2021 Brighton & Hove City Council removed the tamarisk bushes, arguing that they were an invasive species that threatened the natural biodiversity of the area; critics of the decision argued that their removal was motivated by a desire to sanitise the space and drive out cruisers, and that the timing of the removal during the COVID-19 lockdown was intended to avoid public criticism.

==== Manchester ====
The Rochdale Canal's Piccadilly Undercroft has a history as a popular gay cruising spot in Manchester, which has been used for over 50 years. In 2014 it faced controversy due to a number of canal related deaths. This caused speculation that a so called Manchester Pusher was causing the deaths. The council and police considered closing the area off but LGBT+ organisations were critical, stating that it would just move the cruising to another area.

==== Wales ====
In North Wales, Pensarn Beach car park has been known as a cruising area for gay men since the 90s. In 1995, Anthony Davies was murdered by Peter Moore in the car park, after visiting the area looking for a man to attack. Following Moore's conviction, the cruising activity moved to Llanddulas. In 2003, the police warned cruisers to stop using the beach and began contacting LGBT groups with the aim of preventing cruising activity. In 2017 police began patrolling Llanddulas, Flintshire, and Prince’s Wood in Penymynydd in an attempt to stop cruising.

== George Michael ==
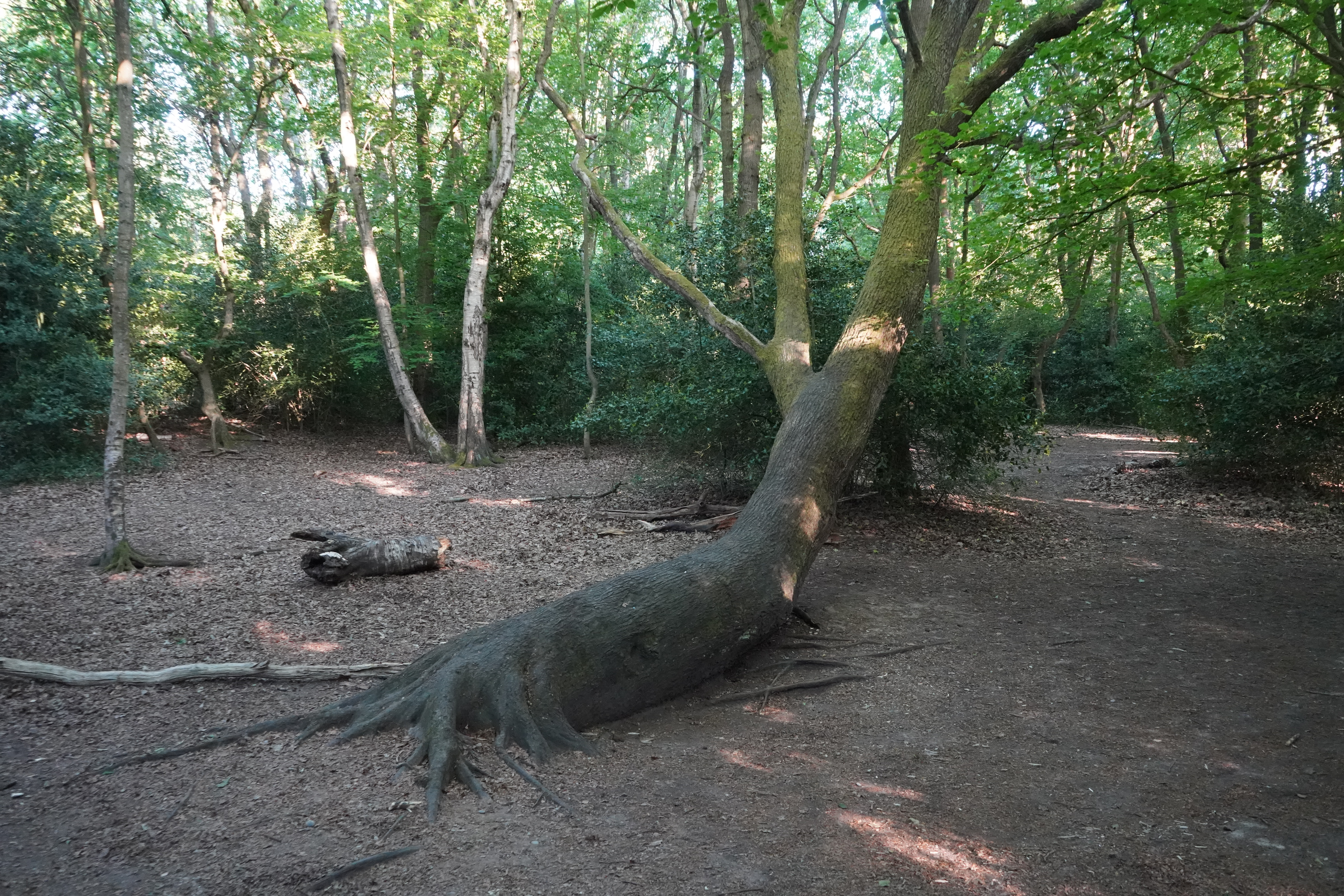
The Fuck Tree is located in Hampstead Heath, a park in Camden, London that has been described as "...the most popular cruising area in London" and it also has a long history of gay cruising going back to Victorian times. 2025

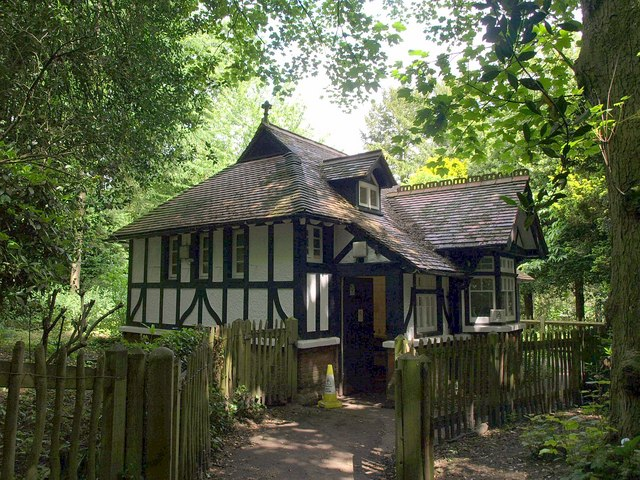
Public toilets on Hampstead Heath, which has been described as "...the most popular cruising area in London" that has a long history of gay cruising going back to the 18th century. In response to a 2006 News of the World story alleging that George Michael had sex on Hampstead Heath, Michael responded "I went out last Tuesday night and uh, came off of Hampstead Heath, I don't even remember if I got any action right,...I don't suppose this will be much of a... story. Which I don't suppose it would have been without the addition of a completely fabricated encounter... ." Photo taken 2013

=== Cruising for sex ===
The popstar George Michael began cruising for gay sex when he was 16 in 1979 and in an interview in 2004 he commented that, "When I made the 'Outside' video I knew I was helping a whole generation of 15-year-olds who are cruising and dying of shame about it. I felt that lightening the stigma around cruising was the most immediately beneficial thing I could do. I know for a fact that when I was 16, 17, when I started cruising, that watching the 'Outside' video would have taken some of the weight off my shoulders."

In the same interview Michael further went on to comment that cruising for gay sex was something that he had done throughout his life, "...that’s the wonderful thing about cruising. The vast majority of men were either married or in the closet. So you have a mutual secret and that’s pretty water tight...If you’re a suburban cruiser like my good self and you like guys that are really straight-acting, then most of the people you pick up...are not going to tell your secret because they’ve got one themselves. I mean, fuck, it worked for years. Interviewer: Was there a moment when people would double-take and realise it was you? Michael: I think probably most of them did. Sometimes we’d talk about it afterwards and have a laugh..."

Michael also commented that havig gay sex with while cruising was one of the ways he was able to meet new people "One of the things about cruising and having a secret sex life for so long is that...it meant that I was constantly meeting ordinary people...And I still believe that with the people I meet for sex. It’s nowhere near as regular as it was but I constantly meet new people via people that I know are cool and I can trust. When you meet somebody, see them a few times, and basically say, ‘who do you know that’s cool and tasty with a big knob?’ [laughing] and I meet people all the time that way."

On the 19th of September 2008 Michael was arrested inside the South End Green underground toilets just over 100 metres from Hampstead Heath station and the southern end of Hampstead Heath. He was found to be in possession of Class A and Class C drugs and was taken to the police station and cautioned for controlled substance possession. In 2009 he discussed what occurred in an interview with the Guardian, "Interviewer: 'And did you have crack with you then?' George Michael: 'No, that wasn't any, that wasn't the car thing. That was another little sexual, that was one of my little sexual things. Anything to do with cruising I don't give a shit really what people think, really... ...you know I've sex in the wong places and they don't agree with my geography when it comes to sex I really don't give a shit...'. Interviewer: '...Were you smoking crack?' Michael: 'Was I? On that occasion? Yeah. You know I didn’t go in there with it. I just said yes as they...' [...said yes as they were doing it in the South End Green underground toilets.]."

=== Hampstead Heath story in a 2006 edition of the "News of the World" ===
In July 2006 the "News of the World" published a story that alleged that George Michael had been having sex at Hampstead Heath in London on the 18th of July 2006. Whilst being interviewed for TV on BBC News 24 shortly after the "News of the World" story was published Michael commented that he had "...never ever seen let alone wanted to have any kind of sexual encounter with..." the individual the "News of the World" alleged that Michael had sex with.

On the 27th of July 2006 Michael commented further that "I went out last Tuesday night and uh, came off of Hampstead Heath, I don't even remember if I got any action right,...and my car was parked right by the public foot, footpath off of Hampstead Heath, or one of them, because I have nothing to hide. I don't worry about people seeing my car there you know, I walked straight off a public pathway on my own...[There were] two photographers who have been tailing me for the best part of 6 months, almost 24 hours a day...went home...I don't suppose this will be much of a of a story. Which I don't suppose it would have been without the addition of a completely fabricated encounter with I suppose a very deliberately chosen very unattractive man in order to try and somehow turn...[it] into some act of desperation, you know."

Michael has further commented that "...the absolutely normal thing to do, is to do it at 2:00 in the morning because...if you cruise um out of sight of the average individual or an individual who's not involved in that cruising then you are in, within the parameters of the law..." Michael also commented that "...there are people able legally to follow me around 24 hours a day...as long as they have cameras, that to me is the issue,...".

During the BBC News 24 interview Michael further described his gay cruising as being "de facto" private, saying, "...it's private that's the point, what I was doing was private...I don't know anybody that actually goes to Hampstead Heath at 2:00 in the morning for anything other than the reason of playing about...If they are there at 2:00 in the morning then they're a little bit strange or they just don't know the local area..."

In a November 1998 MTV interview it was commented that Michael and his partner Kenny Goss, were still together even after he had been arrested for "engaging in lewd conduct" in Los Angeles, "...you didn't break up, it didn't break up your relationship, you guys are still together." with Michael responding "...no and apart from anything else you know, um, even though, I'm not saying I have an open relationship with my boyfriend but he knows who I am. He knows that you know, I'm generally oversexed, so, so he's been very very good... ...it's just he, just we love each other and, and he understands that it was a stupid mistake and, and he's forgiven me I hope." Later on, in a July 2002 interview Michael commented that he was in an open relationship with Kenny Goss saying, "...maybe because I'm, I'm stupid enough to be honest about the fact that I'm not monogamous. Uh, I'm in a long-term relationship. Um, I've been together with my partner for six years. We're in our seventh year... ...We're not monogamous. We live the way many gay couples do...".

Michael further commented in 2004 on Danish television on the way he was publicly outed in Los Angeles, "...it's funny though, I don't,.. ...I don't really even look back and think what was I thinking or regret it because so much good stuff came out of that for me personally, that uh, you know laughable though it is, it doesn't bother me in the slightest."

== Current situation ==
The Sexual Offences Act 2003 prohibits all forms of sexual activity in a public lavatory, but has nothing to say about other forms of cruising. However, persons of any gender who engage in sexual intercourse in public can find themselves charged with offences under the Public Order Act 1986, if the police have sufficient evidence to convince a court of law that the activity was witnessed by a third party, or there was a high likelihood of the activity being witnessed by a third party.

== See also ==
- Cottaging
- Dogging
- Fuck Tree
- Gay beat
- Squirt.org
- Sniffies
