= Anonymous sex =

Sex between unknown individuals

Anonymous sex is a form of one-night stand or casual sex between people who have very little or no history with each other, often engaging in sexual activity on the same day of their meeting and usually never seeing each other again afterwards. The term cruising for sex is used to refer to a person searching for sexual activity with another person, usually anonymously. The internet is also a primary vehicle for people setting up anonymous sex. Anonymous sex is sometimes considered to be a form of prostitution when it involves an exchange of money or drugs for sex.

Some people engage in anonymous sex because of the thrill of the act.

== Risks ==
Anonymous sex is one of the highest-risk sexual activities, both as the sexual history of both partners are unknown to the other, and also because those engaging in anonymous sex are more likely to have had a large number of partners.

== See also ==
- Cottaging
- Gay bathhouse
- Gay beat
- Glory hole
- Zipless fuck
