= Cottaging =

Gay slang term

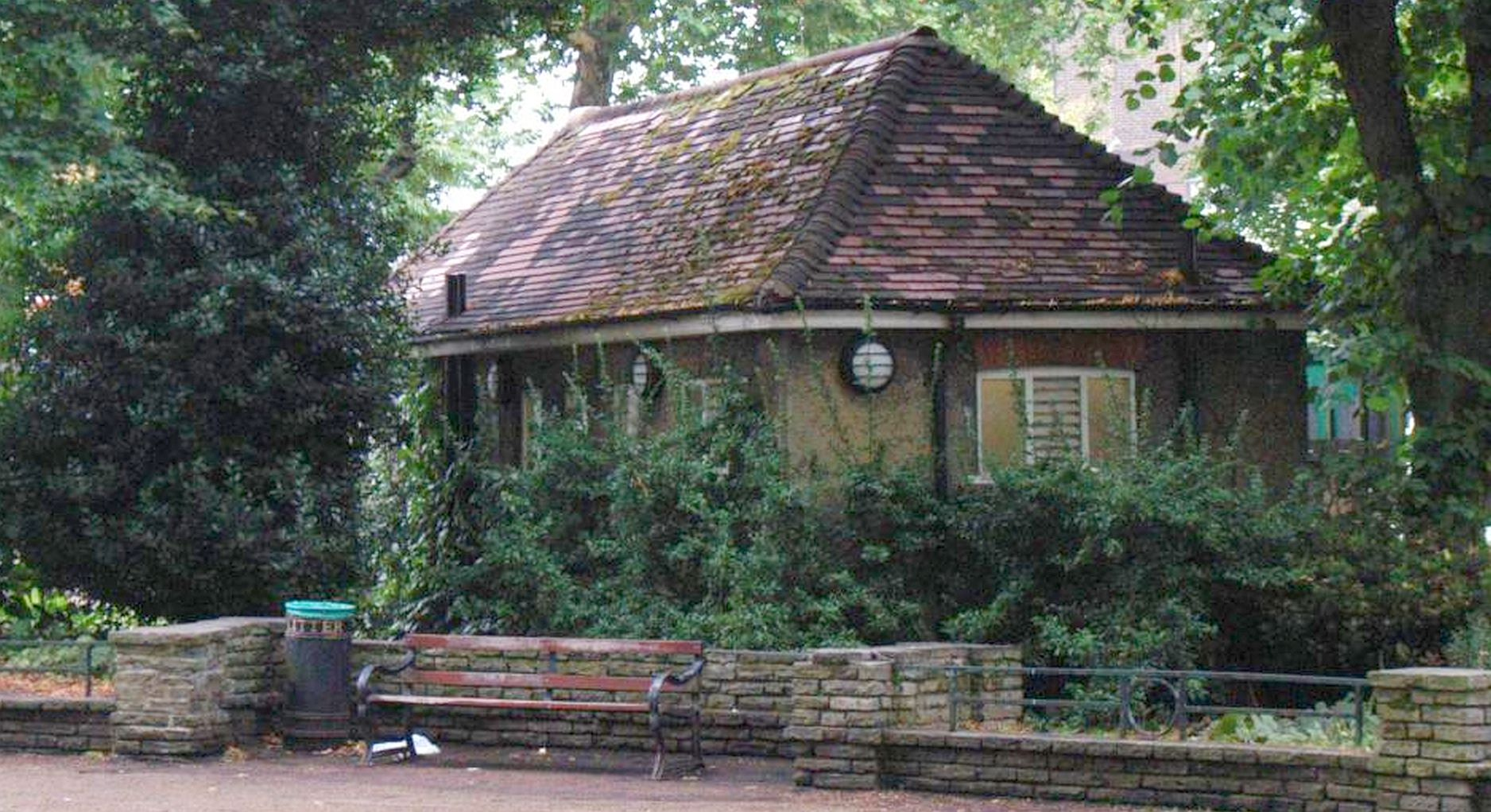
The appearance of public lavatories, like this one in Pond Square, Highgate (London Borough of Camden), is the origin of the term cottaging.

Cottaging is a gay slang term, originating from the United Kingdom, referring to anonymous sex between men in a public lavatory (a "cottage" or "tea-room"), or cruising for sexual partners with the intention of having sex elsewhere. The term has its roots in self-contained English toilet blocks resembling small cottages in their appearance; in the English cant language of Polari this became a double entendre by gay men referring to sexual encounters.

The word "cottage", usually meaning a small, cosy, countryside home, is documented as having been in use during the Victorian era to refer to a public toilet and by the 1960s its use in this sense had become an exclusively homosexual slang term. This usage is predominantly British, though the term is occasionally used with the same meaning in other parts of the world. Among gay men in the United States in the early 1970s, lavatories used for this purpose were called tea rooms.

== History ==
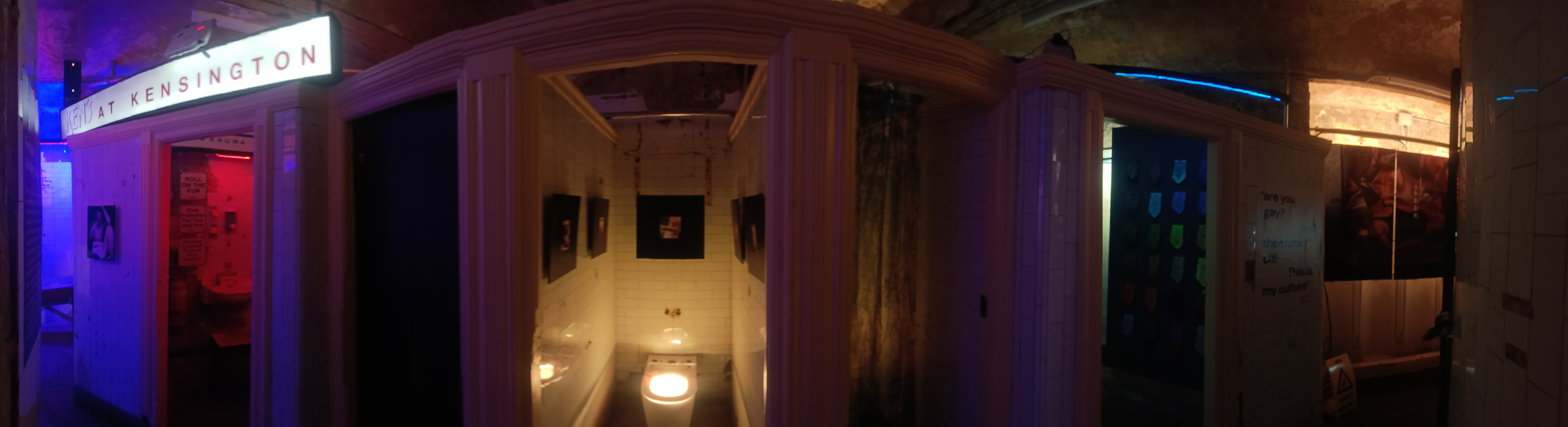
Inside of the underground toilet block exhibition detailing Sydney's gay beat, sauna and cruising culture of the 80's and 90's. The underground male toilets were opened in 1907 in Taylor Square, Darlinghurst, and then closed in 1998 and are now a part of Qtopia Sydney an LGBTQIA+ Museum in Darlinghurst. 2026

In the United Kingdom, gay cruising came about due to the illegality of homosexual acts prior to the Sexual Offences Act 1967, and this illegality meant that many gay men could not live openly as homosexuals. Cruising provided a way for gay men to solicit sexual encounters while minimizing the risk of being caught by the police. When cruising first became known, it usually took place in public fields, parks, toilets and theatres were also sometimes denounced as cruising grounds by moralists of the time. In the 20th century sex in public toilets in the UK became known as "cottaging" and the toilets where sex occurred were referred to as "cottages". Public toilets located next to highways, main roads or rural roads have also become popular cruising sites.

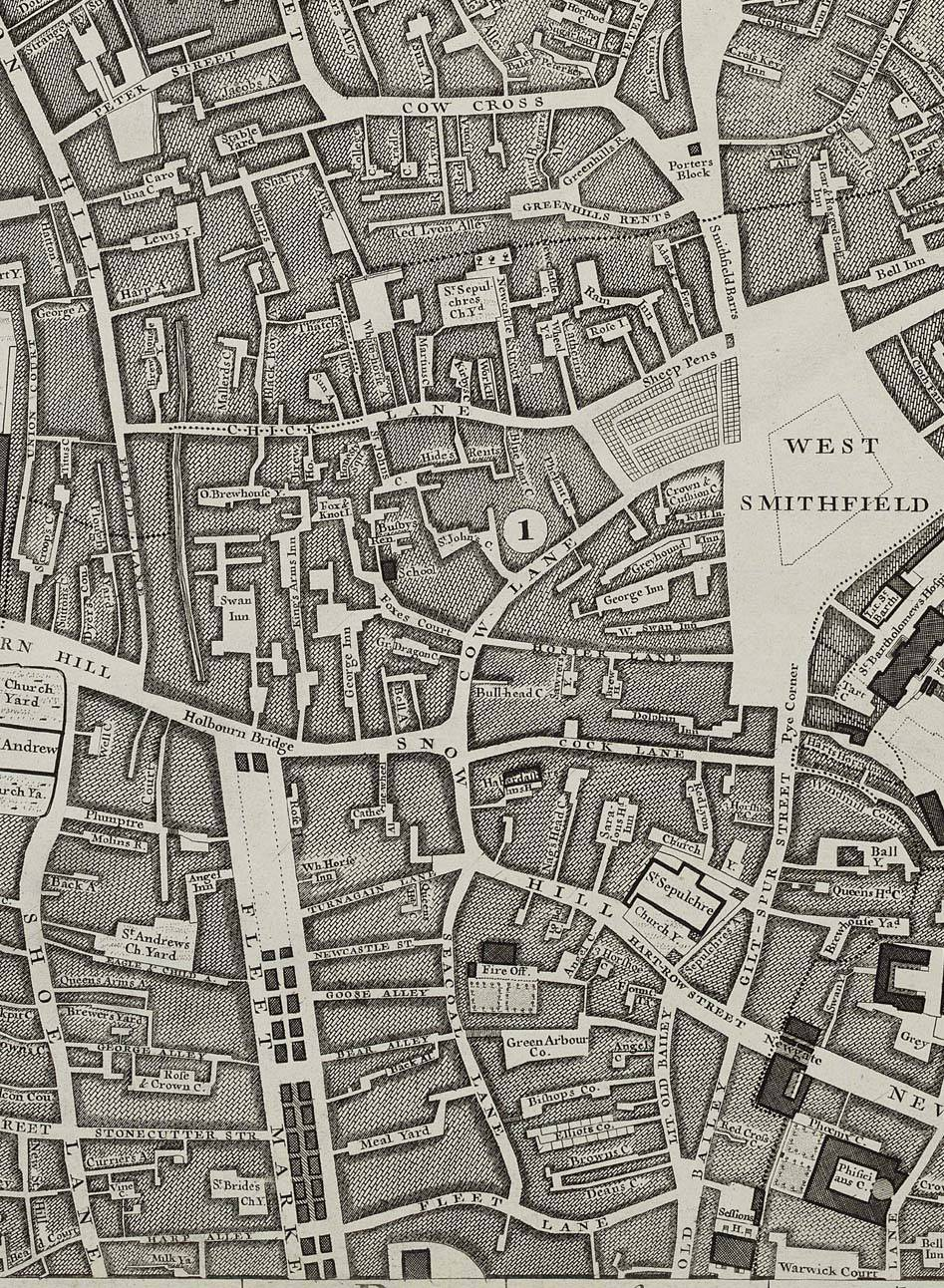
Mother Clap's molly-house was located in Field Lane, Holborn and can be seen on the left side of the map above. Mother Clap's molly-house was the most well known illegal gay brothel in 18th century London and had been open from 1724 to 1726, when a raid sustained by the Societies for the Reformation of Manners had it dismantled and 40 gay men who were present at the molly-house at the time of the raid were taken to Newgate prison where most were eventually set free, although those who weren't were either fined, imprisoned, exhibited in the pillory and three were hanged. Rocque Map of London, 1746.

The illegality of gay sex has meant that the history of gay cruising is sparsely documented, as those who used such cruising grounds were likely to be discreet about them. Rictor Norton, author of Mother Clap's Molly House the title of which is a reference to Margaret Clap's illegal gay brothel known as a "Molly House", believes that the first gay cruising grounds and gay brothels in London may have sprung up in the early 17th century and going from the earliest known records they may have originated even earlier in the late 1600s although they most likely originated much earlier than the 1600s. Mother Clap's molly-house was the most well known of these illegal gay brothels in 18th century London and it had been open from 1724 to 1726, when a raid sustained by the Societies for the Reformation of Manners had it dismantled and 40 gay men who were present at the molly-house at the time of the raid were taken to Newgate prison where most were eventually set free, although those who weren't were either fined, imprisoned, exhibited in the pillory and three were hanged.

Author Mark Turner comments that evidence of gay cruising goes back to at least the 18th century, stating "From St James's Park in the 18th century to Hampstead Heath today, gay men have always gone cruising in search of sex... ...Cruising is nothing new. It's been going on for hundreds of years, and its history is a part of the history of our cities and public spaces. As cities grew and populations became more anonymous, new opportunities for chance encounters arose, for straight and queer people alike... By night, teenagers hop fences to snog, hookers and rent boys ply their trade, lovers admire the moon, addicts shoot up, and gay men fuck... ...George Michael is right to drop his pants and lay claim to his queer culture - to a history of urban sexual adventure and misadventure that is as old and perverse as the parks themselves." Turner has further commented that in "Thomas Gilbert's 'A View of the Town' from the 18th century, a man leaves his wife in their bridal bed, sneaks off to St James's Park, 'roams in search of some vile ingle prize' and 'courts the foul pathick in the fair one's place'... ...such queer encounters in parks, on embankments, in toilets, streets and back alleys are an integral part of the way our cities - and sexualities - express themselves. Where there is public space, there will be diverse appropriations of it, and so it should be.

== Locations ==
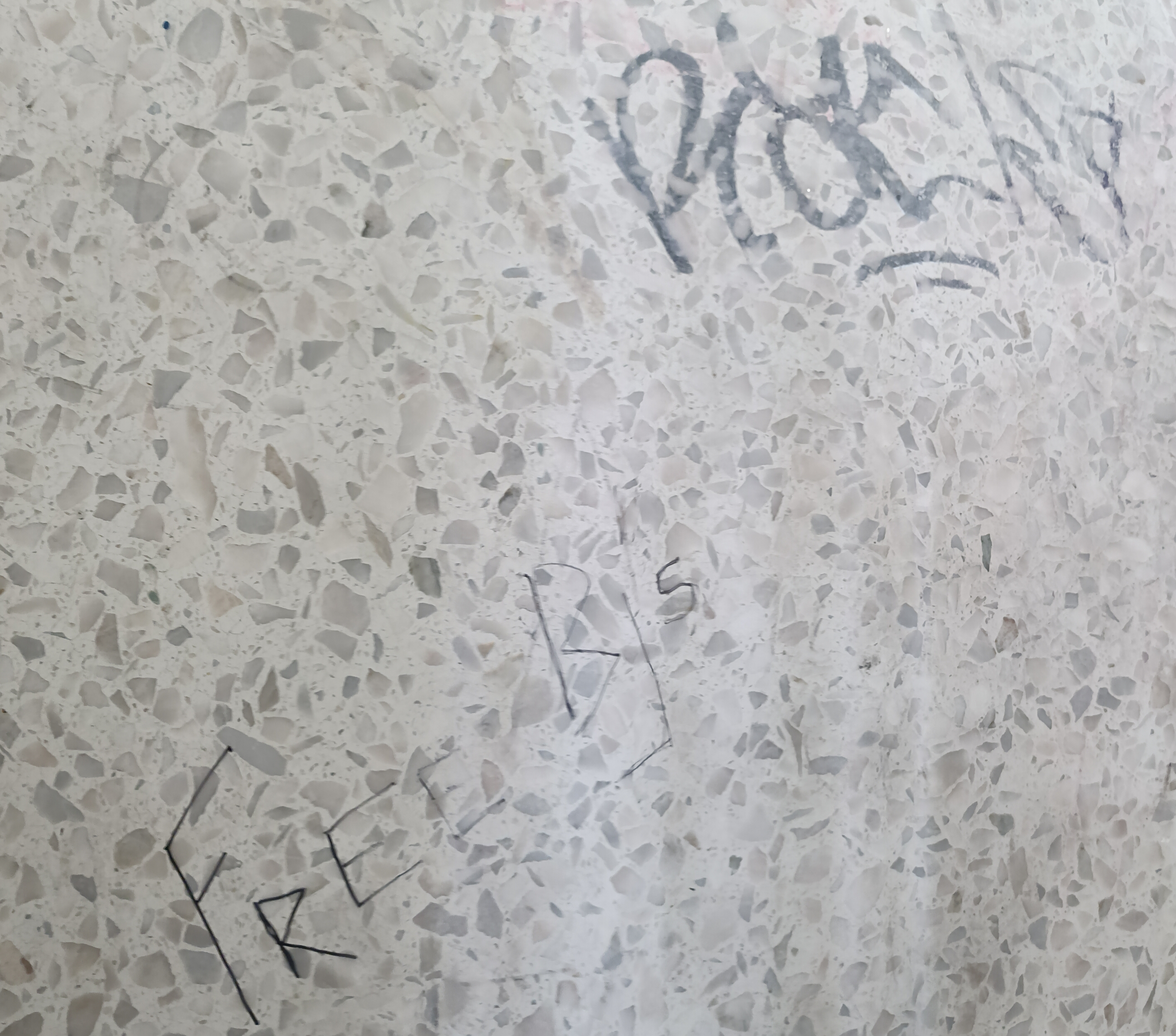
Graffiti on the side of a cubicle in a male toilet. Sydney, Australia 2024

Cottages were and are located in places heavily used by many people such as bus stations, railway stations, airports and university campuses. Often, glory holes are drilled in the walls between cubicles in popular cottages. Foot signals—tapping a foot, sliding a foot slightly under the divider between stalls, attracting the attention of the occupant of the next stall—are used to signify that one wishes to connect with the person in the next cubicle. In some heavily used cottages, an etiquette develops and one person may function as a lookout to warn if non-cottagers are coming.

Since the 1980s, more individuals in authority have become more aware of the existence of cottages in places under their jurisdiction; as such, they have reduced the height of (or even removed doors from) the cubicles of popular cottages, or extended the walls between the cubicles to the floor to prevent foot signalling.

=== Australia ===
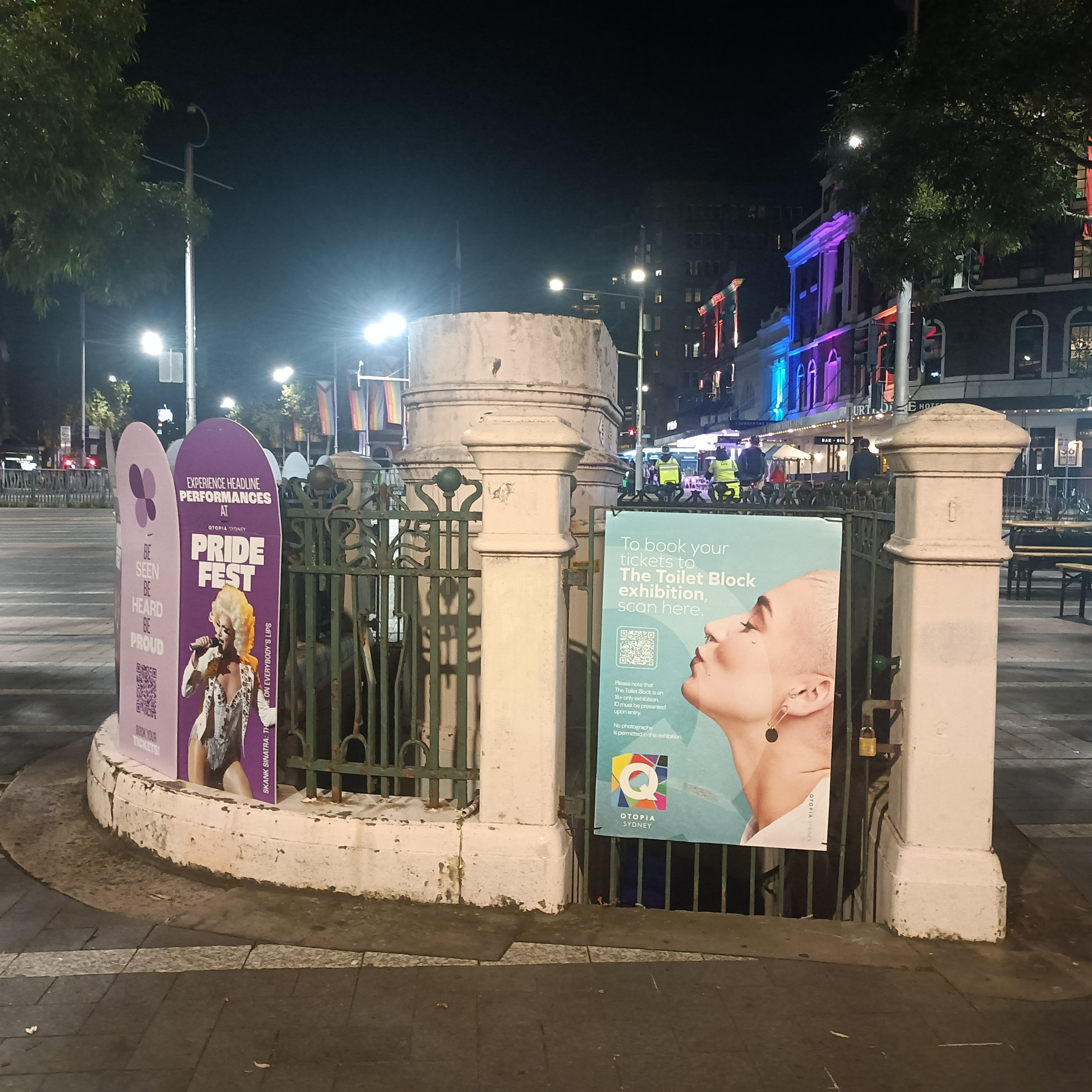
The entrance to the underground toilet block with stairs leading down to the toilets from the northern end of Taylor Square. The toilets were a popular place for people to cruise for gay sex in Sydney for decades until its closure in 1998. In 2024 the toilet block became a part of Qtopia Sydney, and it now hosts "...adults-only exhibitions exploring Sydney's gay beat, sauna and cruising culture of the 1980s and 90s...". 2026

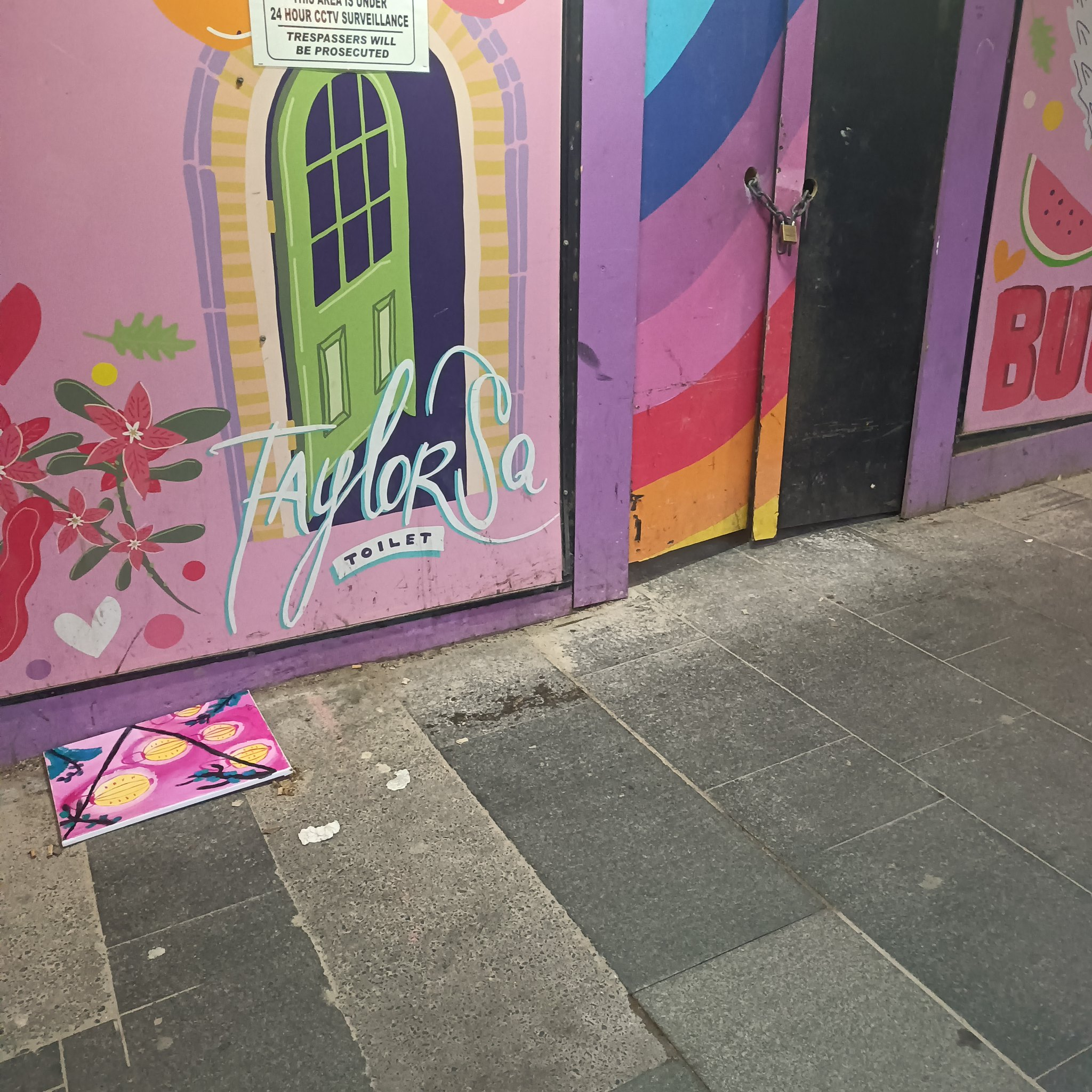
Construction hoarding alongside Oxford street in Darlinghurst, Sydney that references the underground toilets in Taylor Square, Darlinghurst, indicating their connection to the queer community through it being a popular place for people to randomly meet and have sex. 2025

An underground male toilet block located at the northern end of Taylor Square, Sydney, that was opened to the public in 1907, was a popular place for people to cruise for gay sex in Sydney for decades until its closure in 1998.

In 2024 the underground toilet block became a part of Qtopia Sydney, a museum that has an extensive collection of objects related to queer culture in Sydney and the toilet block now hosts "exhibitions exploring Sydney's gay beat, sauna and cruising culture of the 1980s and 90s." Qtopia also has a 40-seat theatre located right next to the underground toilet block, inside of a decommissioned electrical substation and it hosts performances including music, drag, comedy, cabaret and poetry all year round with numerous performances held during Sydney Gay and Lesbian Mardi Gras in February and March of each year. Female toilets were opened next door to the male toilets in 1938 and they were located in the above ground section of the substation building until they closed in 1988.

Another popular gay cruising location used to exist in a public toilet block off Yarra Bend Road in Melbourne and it was commented in a 2012 article that "As a dutiful dog walker I have been an observer of the beat for a long time...In all the years I’ve been walking by, I have only seen this car park empty once...for the cruisers, at least those daytime subjects of my curiosity, are not chatty folk. Their language is a subtle one of glances and head-turns – I’ve never seen them converse. They pull into the car park, sometimes sit for a while, sometimes move straight to the toilets; there are always one or two lonely souls wandering the grass. The men size each other up continuously, hyper-alert to each new arrival. Some stay only briefly, others settle in for the afternoon. Cars come and go, all kinds of cars – muscle cars, tradesmen’s vans, family station wagons. The men are all kinds, too – young, old, business-suited, tracksuited...The busiest times are lunch and after dark – the narrow road becomes jammed."

== Cottages as meeting places ==
Before the gay liberation movement, many, if not most, gay and bisexual men at the time were closeted and there were almost no public gay social groups for those under legal drinking age. As such, cottages were among the few places where men too young to get into gay bars could meet others whom they knew to be gay.

The internet brought significant changes to cottaging, which was previously an activity engaged in by men with other men, often in silence with no communication beyond the markings of a cubicle wall. Today, an online community has been established in which men exchange details of locations, discussing aspects such as when it receives the highest traffic, when it is safest and to facilitate sexual encounters by arranging meeting times. The term cybercottage is used by some gay and bisexual men who use the role-play and nostalgia of cottaging in a virtual space or as a notice board to arrange real life anonymous sexual encounters.

Laud Humphrey's Tearoom Trade, published in 1970, was a sociological analysis and observance between the social space public restrooms offer for anonymous sex and the men—either closeted, gay, or straight—who sought to fulfill sexual desires that their wives, religion, or social lives could not. The study, which was met with praise on one side due to its innovation and criticism on the other due to having outed "straight" men and risked their privacy, brought to light the multidimensionality of public restrooms and the intricacy and complexity of homosexual sex amongst self-identifying straight men.

== George Michael ==
The music video for the song "Outside" by George Michael satirises the events that occurred during his April 1998 arrest in a public toilet in Los Angeles. In 2004 he commented that "I do think I was set up between Fleet Street and the Beverly Hills Police Force. I'm absolutely convinced...I found out things in the week after that arrest that totally suggest that there was corrupt, major corruption going on."

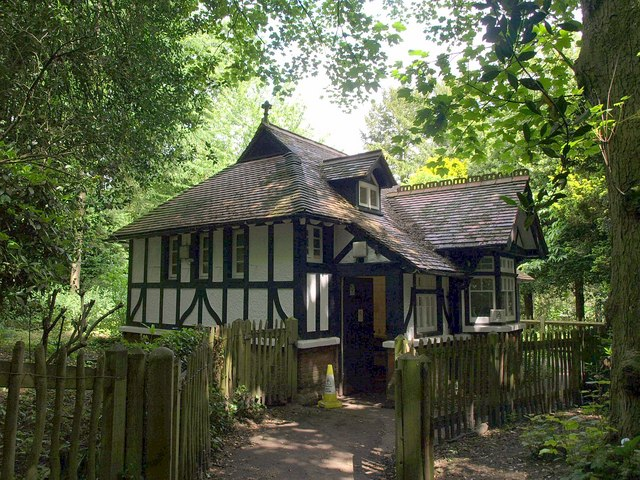
Public toilets on Hampstead Heath, which has been described as "...the most popular cruising area in London" that has a long history of gay cruising going back to the 18th century. In response to a 2006 News of the World story alleging that George Michael had sex on Hampstead Heath, Michael responded "I went out last Tuesday night and uh, came off of Hampstead Heath, I don't even remember if I got any action right,...I don't suppose this will be much of a... story. Which I don't suppose it would have been without the addition of a completely fabricated encounter... ." Photo taken 2013

=== Cruising for sex ===
The UK popstar George Michael began cruising for gay sex when he was 16 in 1979 and in an interview in 2004 he commented that, "When I made the 'Outside' video I knew I was helping a whole generation of 15-year-olds who are cruising and dying of shame about it. I felt that lightening the stigma around cruising was the most immediately beneficial thing I could do. I know for a fact that when I was 16, 17, when I started cruising, that watching the 'Outside' video would have taken some of the weight off my shoulders."

In the same interview Michael further went on to comment that cruising for gay sex was something that he had done throughout his entire life, "...that’s the wonderful thing about cruising. The vast majority of men were either married or in the closet. So you have a mutual secret and that’s pretty water tight...If you’re a suburban cruiser like my good self and you like guys that are really straight-acting, then most of the people you pick up...are not going to tell your secret because they’ve got one themselves. I mean, fuck, it worked for years. Interviewer: Was there a moment when people would double-take and realise it was you? Michael: I think probably most of them did. Sometimes we’d talk about it afterwards and have a laugh..."

Michael also commented that having gay sex while cruising was one of the ways he was able to meet new people "One of the things about cruising and having a secret sex life for so long is that...it meant that I was constantly meeting ordinary people...And I still believe that with the people I meet for sex. It’s nowhere near as regular as it was but I constantly meet new people via people that I know are cool and I can trust. When you meet somebody, see them a few times, and basically say, ‘who do you know that’s cool and tasty with a big knob?’ [laughing] and I meet people all the time that way."

On the 19th of September 2008 Michael was arrested inside the South End Green underground toilets just over 100 metres from Hampstead Heath station and the southern end of Hampstead Heath. He was found to be in possession of Class A and Class C drugs and was taken to the police station and cautioned for controlled substance possession. In 2009 he discussed what occurred in an interview with the Guardian, "Interviewer: 'And did you have crack with you then?' George Michael: 'No, that wasn't any, that wasn't the car thing. That was another little sexual, that was one of my little sexual things. Anything to do with cruising I don't give a shit really what people think, really... ...you know I've sex in the wong places and they don't agree with my geography when it comes to sex I really don't give a shit...'. Interviewer: '...Were you smoking crack?' Michael: 'Was I? On that occasion? Yeah. You know I didn’t go in there with it. I just said yes as they...' [...said yes as they were doing it in the South End Green underground toilets.]".

=== 1998 arrest in a public toilet in Los Angeles ===
On the 6th of April 1998 George Michael was arrested for "engaging in a lewd act" in a public toilet in Los Angeles. Michael commented in a November 1998 MTV interview that "I got followed into the restroom and then this cop — I didn't know it was a cop, obviously — he started playing this game, which I think is called, 'I'll show you mine, you show me yours, and then when you show me yours, I'm going to nick you!'...Actually, what happened was once he got an eyeful, he walked past me, straight past me and out, and I thought, that's kind of odd. I thought, maybe he's just not impressed. And then I went to walk back to my car, and as I got back to the car, I was arrested on the street. ... If someone's waving their genitalia at you, you don't automatically assume that they're an officer of the law...". Whilst on the Late Show with David Letterman Michael commented that "...actually the police report said that he was simulating urination...if you tried to simulate urination doing that with your hand you'd get wee all over the shop is all I can say." Michael further commented on Letterman that "...the police are not allowed to do something illegal in order to make you do something illegal, you know, it was definite entrapment."

Michael was not obligated to attend the court hearing in person which he did not do and he pleaded "no contest" to the charge in court and was given an $810 fine and ordered to do 80 hours of community service and Michael commented that "...normally if you pay your fine you don't do community service but I'm doing community service which is yet to be arranged but I will do it...". Michael also commented that he had "...been given, twice the probation people normally get..." which was a 2-year probation period and that he was ordered to participate in sex therapy and was given double the penalty that would normally be given in such a circumstance. He also commented that the judge said he would "...throw me in jail next time" if he did it again and that the toilet in the music video for "Outside" was not the same as the one he was arrested at as he was "...not allowed to go back there...". Later on in 1998 Michael satirised the events that occurred during his arrest in Los Angeles in the music video for the song "Outside" and was sued by one of the officers in the original arrest for portraying him as non-heterosexual and mocking him and the suit was ultimately dismissed.

Michael has commented in relation to his arrest on MTV in 2004 that "It was definitely setup, but, on top of the setup, I was like one of the people setting myself up, you know, they only had to do two thirds of the work... ." In a 2004 TV interview for Danish television he commented that "I do think I was set up between Fleet Street and the Beverly Hills Police Force. I'm absolutely convinced that there was serious corruption going on. And I found out things in the week after that arrest that totally suggest that there was corrupt, major corruption going on." In a 1998 TV interview in the Netherlands Michael commented, "...the actual arrest, the arrest itself was illegal so the video is my perfect opportunity. I mean, I might not be able to tell people exactly what happened but I can at least say, 'look, one I can laugh about it... Interviewer: You were arrested for disorderly conduct, how disorderly was it? Michael: Well it was no, no more or less disorderly than the policeman involved put it that way." In a 2012 LBC radio interview Michael also commented that "I mean I promise you the day that I got arrested in, in Los Angeles...the day that that happened, because it was all organized between um the News of the World and the, or the Sun, and the the LA police. Believe me, it was a setup, right?...But the day that they actually succeeded in outing me, the Sun newspaper closed down for the afternoon and had a party."

In an MTV interview in November 1998 it was commented to Michael that after his arrest in Los Angeles earlier that year, that he and his partner Kenny Goss were still together, with Michael responding "...I'm not saying I have an open relationship with my boyfriend but he knows who I am. He knows that you know, I'm generally oversexed, so, so he's been very very good...". In an interview in July 2002 Michael further commented that "...maybe because I'm, I'm stupid enough to be honest about the fact that I'm not monogamous. Uh, I'm in a long-term relationship. Um, I've been together with my partner for six years. We're in our seventh year... ...We're not monogamous. We live the way many gay couples do...".

Michael further commented in 2004 on Danish television on the way he was publicly outed in Los Angeles, "...it's funny though, I don't,.. ...I don't really even look back and think what was I thinking or regret it because so much good stuff came out of that for me personally, that uh, you know laughable though it is, it doesn't bother me in the slightest."

=== Hampstead Heath story in a 2006 edition of the "News of the World" ===
In July 2006 the "News of the World" published a story that alleged that Michael had been having sex on Hampstead Heath in London on the 18th of July 2006. Whilst being interviewed for TV on BBC News 24 shortly after the "News of the World" story was published Michael commented that he had "...never ever seen let alone wanted to have any kind of sexual encounter with..." the individual the News of the World alleged that Michael had sex with.

On the 27th of July 2006 Michael commented further that "I went out last Tuesday night and uh, came off of Hampstead Heath, I don't even remember if I got any action right,...and my car was parked right by the public foot, footpath off of Hampstead Heath, or one of them, because I have nothing to hide. I don't worry about people seeing my car there you know, I walked straight off a public pathway on my own...[There were] two photographers who have been tailing me for the best part of 6 months, almost 24 hours a day...went home...I don't suppose this will be much of a of a story. Which I don't suppose it would have been without the addition of a completely fabricated encounter with I suppose a very deliberately chosen very unattractive man in order to try and somehow turn...[it] into some act of desperation, you know."

Michael has further commented that "...the absolutely normal thing to do, is to do it at 2:00 in the morning because...if you cruise um, out of sight of the average individual or an individual who's not involved in that cruising then you are in, within the parameters of the law..." Michael also commented that "...there are people able legally to follow me around 24 hours a day...as long as they have cameras, that to me is the issue...". During the BBC News 24 interview Michael further described his gay cruising as being "de facto" private, saying "...it's private that's the point, what I was doing was private...I don't know anybody that actually goes to Hampstead Heath at 2:00 in the morning for anything other than the reason of playing about...If they are there at 2:00 in the morning then they're a little bit strange or they just don't know the local area...". In the 2007 Extras Christmas Special Michael appears in a scene which begins with Ricky Gervais's character, Andy Millman, sitting on a park bench on Hampstead Heath talking to a third character who is cruising for gay sex, and then ends with Michael leaving the bench and walking off into the Heath to cruise for sex in the bushes while a newspaper photographer then arrives looking for a photo and they are then told of Michael's hidden location inside the bushes by Andy Millman.

Later on in 1998, after George Michael had been arrested in Los Angeles Boy George commented that "I think it was really a lot of fuss about nothing really. I mean, I think it's okay to have sex in public places. I live on Hampstead Heath. Everybody does it up there."

== Legal status ==
Sexual acts in public lavatories are outlawed by many jurisdictions. It is likely that the element of risk involved in cottaging makes it an attractive activity to some.

Historically, in the United Kingdom, public gay sex often resulted in a charge and conviction of gross indecency, an offence only pertaining to sexual acts committed by males and particularly applied to homosexual activity. Anal penetration was a separate and much more serious crime that came under the definition of buggery. Buggery was a capital offence between 1533 and 1861 under UK law, although it rarely resulted in a death sentence. Importuning was an offer of sexual gratification between men, often for money. The Sexual Offences Act 1967 permitted sex between consenting men over 21 years of age when conducted in private, but the act specifically excluded public lavatories from being "private". The Sexual Offences Act 2003 replaced this aspect with the offence of "Sexual activity in a public lavatory" which includes solo masturbation.

In some of the cases where people were brought to court for cottaging, the issue of entrapment arose. Since the offences were public but often carried out behind closed lavatory doors, the police sometimes found it easier to use undercover police officers, who would frequent toilets posing as homosexuals in an effort to entice other men to approach them for sex. These men would then be arrested for importuning or soliciting and in some cases indecent assault.

=== Timeline of historic cases ===
Date	Event
1943	Newspaper editor Clarence McNulty was arrested for wilfully and obscenely exposing his person in the Lang Park toilets near Wynyard railway station, Sydney, in New South Wales, Australia. He denied the charges and this early case highlighted the practice of the police using pretty policemen (i.e. as "bait") to entrap the public. As only one police officer was present in the toilet, the magistrate determined that the police were unable to correctly corroborate the evidence and gave McNulty the benefit of the doubt.
1946	Sir George Robert Mowbray, 5th Baronet, was fined for importuning men at Piccadilly Circus Underground station.
1940s	Labour MP Tom Driberg was charged with indecent assault after two men shared his bed in the 1940s and used his position as a journalist several times to get off later charges when caught soliciting in public toilets by the police.
1953	Actor John Gielgud was arrested and fined £10 for cottaging ("persistently importuning").
1953	MP William J. Field was arrested for persistently importuning in a public toilet. Field appealed against the conviction twice but failed on both occasions.
1954	American mathematician John Forbes Nash, Jr. arrested in a public toilet in Santa Monica, California. He was stripped of his top-secret security clearance and fired from the think tank where he was a consultant.
1956	Sir David Milne-Watson was fined for importuning at South Kensington railway station.
1962	On 6 November 1962, actor Wilfrid Brambell was arrested in a toilet in Shepherd's Bush for persistently importuning.
1962	In 1962, the Mansfield, Ohio Police Department conducted a sting operation in which they covertly filmed men having sex in the public restroom underneath Central Park. Thirty-eight men were convicted and jailed for sodomy. After the arrest, the city closed the restrooms and backfilled the site. The police later made a training film of the footage. It was rereleased in 2007 as Tearoom.
1964	In October, US President Lyndon B. Johnson's aide Walter Jenkins was arrested in a YMCA in Washington, D.C., and the case was subsequently dismissed.
1968	Michael Turnbull was arrested in Hull for cottaging in a public toilet, before he became Bishop of Durham.
1975	In September 1975, actor Peter Wyngarde was arrested (under his real name, Cyril Louis Goldbert) in Gloucester bus station public toilets for gross indecency with Richard Jack Whalley (a truck driver). He was fined £75.
1976	Sixty-six-year-old retired U.S. Major General Edwin Walker made sexual advances to an undercover police officer in a public lavatory at a park in Dallas, Texas, on June 23, 1976, and was arrested for public lewdness. The general pleaded no contest and was fined $1,000 and court costs.
1976	Former Judge G. Harrold Carswell was convicted of battery for advances he made to an undercover police officer in a Tallahassee public lavatory.
1981	Coronation Street actor Peter Dudley was observed exposing himself to another man in a public toilet in Didsbury, Manchester, and was charged with importuning. He pleaded guilty and was fined £200. Some months later, Dudley was charged again with gross indecency for an alleged similar offence, though this time he claimed he was not guilty and had been set up by the police. A Crown Court jury failed to reach a verdict, but while waiting for a retrial, Dudley suffered a series of strokes and heart attacks and died on 20 October 1983.
1984	The Labour MP Roger Thomas was convicted in Swansea of importuning for immoral purposes in a men's lavatory. He was fined £75.
1984	Actor Leonard Sachs was fined for importuning in a public toilet.
1988	Australian radio personality Alan Jones was arrested in a public lavatory block in London's West End and charged with two counts of outraging public decency by behaving in an indecent manner under the Westminster by-laws. He was later cleared of all charges and awarded costs.
1990	British pop star Stedman Pearson (of the group Five Star) appeared at Kingston Magistrates Court in October 1990 and pleaded guilty to a charge of public indecency after being arrested in a public toilet in New Malden in London.
1998	On the 6th of April 1998 George Michael was arrested for "engaging in a lewd act" in a public toilet in Los Angeles. Michael commented in a November 1998 MTV interview that "I got followed into the restroom and then this cop... ...started playing this game, which I think is called, 'I'll show you mine, you show me yours, and then when you show me yours, I'm going to nick you!'... ...If someone's waving their genitalia at you, you don't automatically assume that they're an officer of the law...". Whilst on the Late Show with David Letterman Michael commented that "...actually the police report said that he was simulating urination...if you tried to simulate urination doing that with your hand you'd get wee all over the shop is all I can say." Michael further commented on Letterman that "...the police are not allowed to do something illegal in order to make you do something illegal, you know, it was definite entrapment." He was given an $810 fine and ordered to do 80 hours of community service and was ordered to participate in sex therapy. In a 2004 TV interview he commented that "I do think I was set up between Fleet Street and the Beverly Hills Police Force. I'm absolutely convinced that there was serious corruption going on. And I found out things in the week after that arrest that totally suggest that there was corrupt, major corruption going on."
1998	In October 1998, Labour Party MP Ron Davies was mugged at knifepoint on Clapham Common. He resigned after it became clear he was engaging in homosexual activities in a known cottaging area.
2007	On 11 June 2007, Republican US Senator Larry Craig was arrested in the men's public toilet in the Lindbergh Terminal of the Minneapolis–Saint Paul International Airport for allegedly soliciting sex. Craig later pleaded guilty to disorderly conduct and announced his intent to resign from his post as Republican senator from Idaho; ultimately, he did not resign. He contested his guilty plea, paid a fine, and served out his term; he did not run for re-election in 2008.

== Cultural response ==
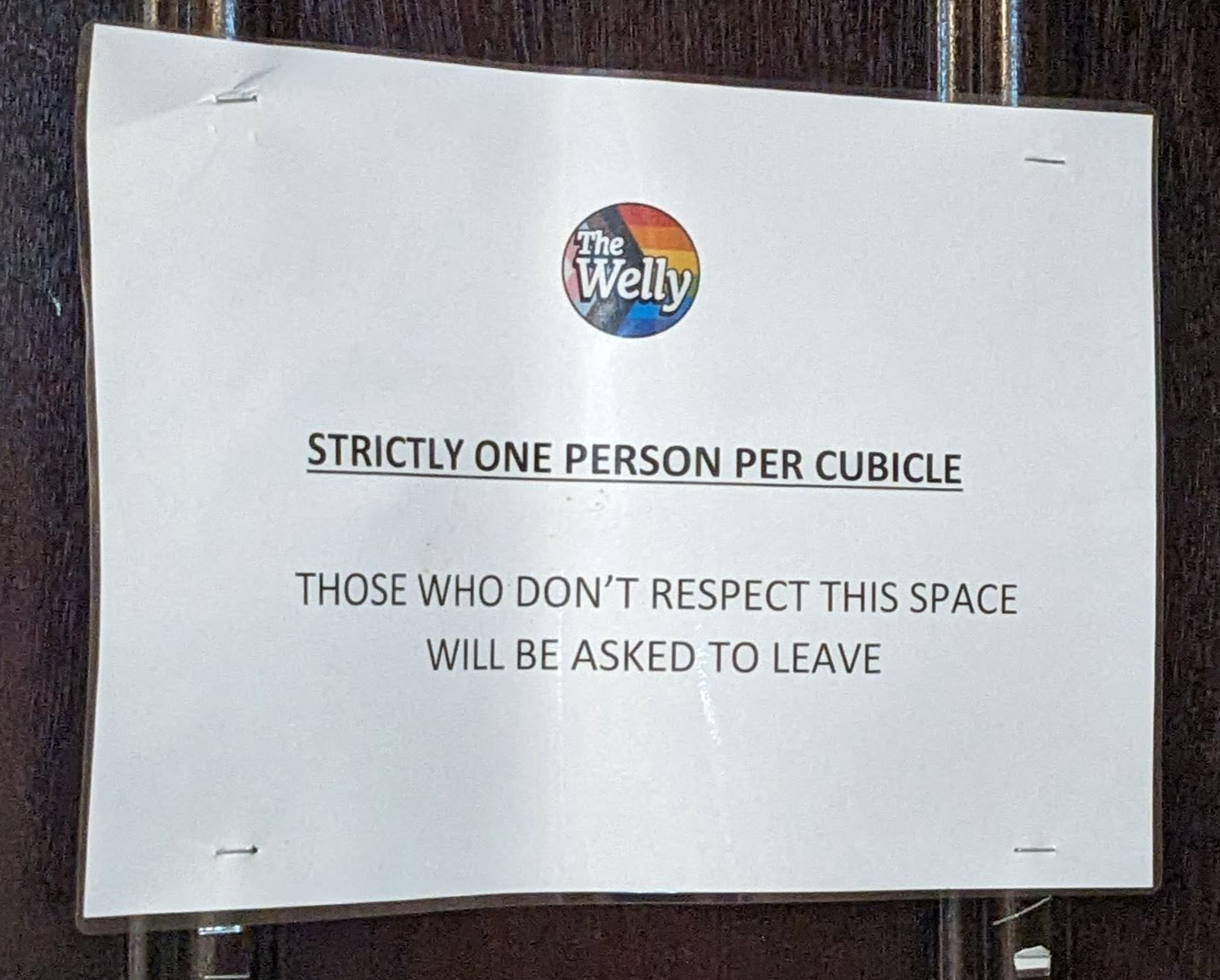
A sign outside a toilet cubicle in the Duke of Wellington gay bar in Soho which explains that it is one person per cubicle. 2023

- After the murder of playwright Joe Orton by his boyfriend Kenneth Halliwell in 1967, Orton's diaries were published and included explicit accounts of cottaging in London toilets. The diaries were the basis of the 1987 film Prick Up Your Ears and the play of the same name.
- The film Get Real was based on the 1992 play What's Wrong with Angry?, which features schoolboys cottaging as a key theme.
- The 1992 play Porcelain by Singaporean-born playwright Chay Yew describes cottaging as a backdrop of violence between a gay Asian man and his white lover in a Bethnal Green lavatory.
- The 1994 book Hammy House by Kaye Umansky features a character named Edward Green, known for his cottaging activities.
- The Chinese film East Palace, West Palace, released in 1996, is centred on cottaging activity in Beijing.
- The modern dance company, DV8, staged a piece in 2003 called Men Who Have Sex With Men (MSM), which explicitly portrayed the theme of cottaging.
- Nicholas de Jongh's play Plague Over England was based on the arrest and conviction of John Gielgud for cottaging and premièred in 2008.
- The 2017 video game The Tearoom by independent developer Robert Yang simulates cottaging practices set in a public restroom in 1962 Mansfield, Ohio.
- The 1996 comedy film Kids in the Hall: Brain Candy includes a sequence in which their inept police officer characters manage to arrest only one suspect from a crowded park restroom after dark: Scott Thompson's Danny Husk/Walter Terzinsky, a character who is deeply in denial.

== See also ==
- Cruising for sex
- Dogging
- Gay bathhouse
- Gay cruising in Australia
- Gay cruising in England and Wales
