= Glory hole =

Hole in a wall or partition to engage in sexual activities

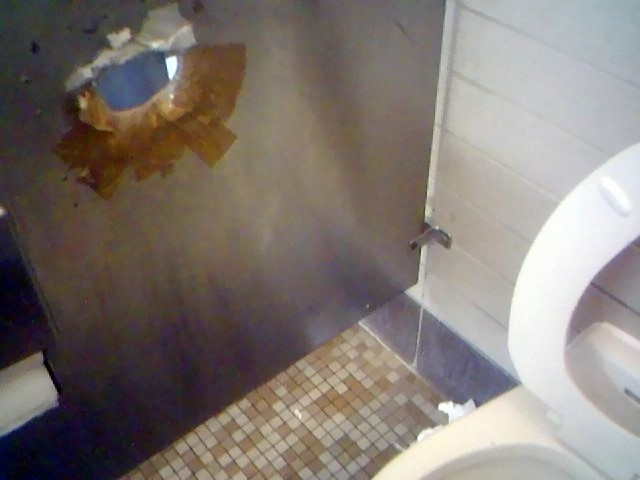
A glory hole in a restroom cubicle

A glory hole (also spelled gloryhole and glory-hole) is a hole in a wall or partition, often between public toilet cubicles, public shower cubicles or sex video arcade booths and lounges, for people to engage in sexual activity or to observe the person on the opposite side.

Glory holes are especially associated with gay male culture and anal or oral sex. They are not exclusively favoured by gay people and have become more commonly acknowledged as a fetish for heterosexual and bisexual individuals as well.

In recent years, public glory holes have faded in popularity in many countries, or have simply been removed or closed up by authorities, although some gay websites offer directories of remaining ones. Glory holes are sometimes a topic of erotic literature, and pornographic films have been devoted to their use.

== Motivations ==
Numerous motivations can be ascribed to the use and eroticism of glory holes. As a wall separates the two participants, they have no contact except for a penis and a mouth, hand, anus, or vagina. Almost total anonymity is maintained, as no other attributes are taken into consideration. The glory hole is seen as an erotic oasis in gay subcultures around the world; people's motives, experiences and attributions of value in its use are varied.

In light of the ongoing HIV pandemic, many gay men reevaluated their sexual and erotic desires and practices. Queer theorist Tim Dean has suggested that glory holes allow for a physical barrier, which may be an extension of psychological barriers, in which there is internalized homophobia (a result of many societies' reluctance to discuss LGBT practices and people). For some gay men, a glory hole depersonalizes their partner altogether as a disembodied object of sexual desire.

== History ==
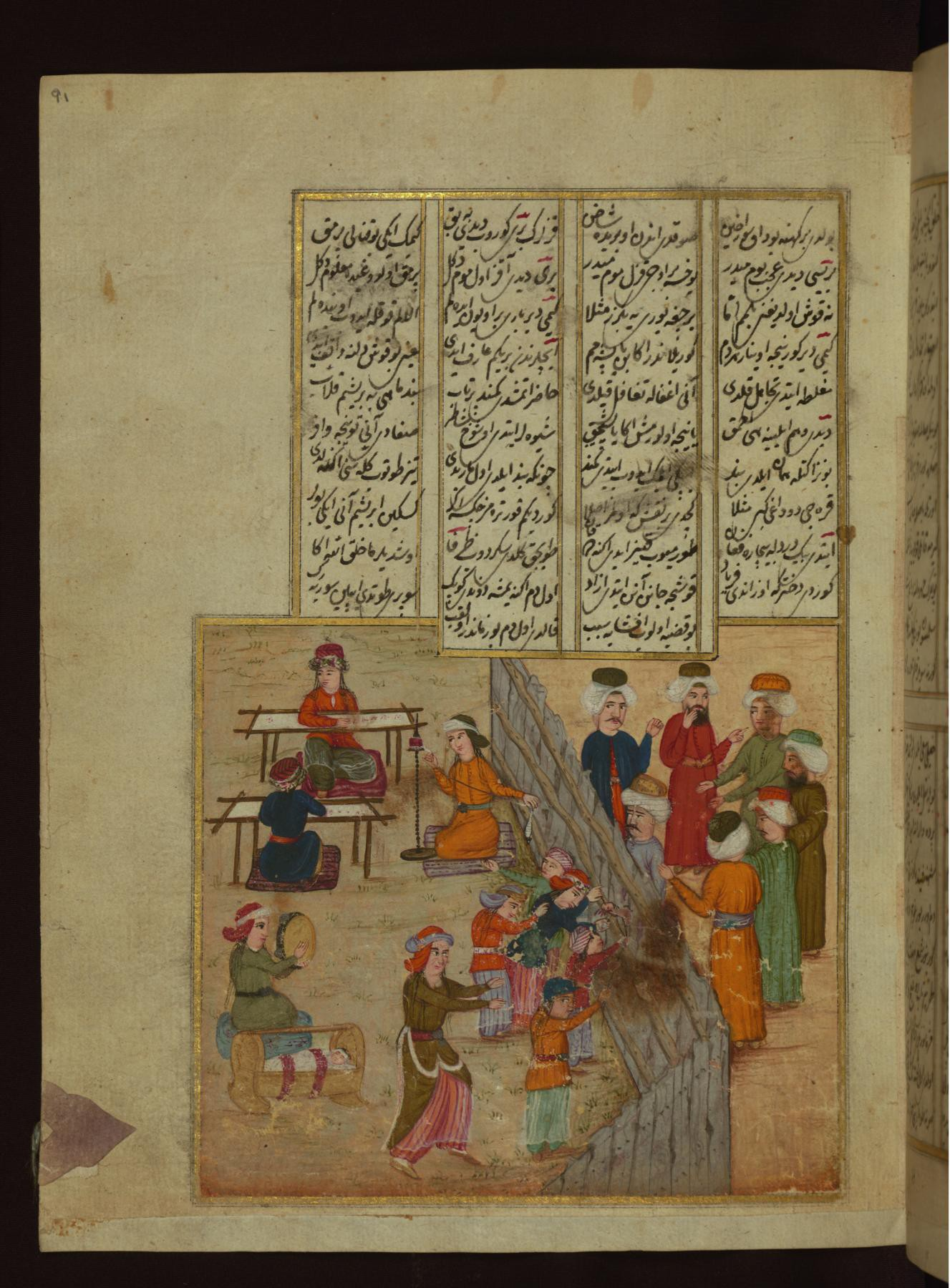
A Man Exposing Himself Through a Hole in the Fence, 1600–1635, by Nev'îzâde Atâyî

The first documented instance of a glory hole was in a 1707 court case known as the "Tryals of Thomas Vaughan and Thomas Davis" in London, which involved the extortion of a man known in the documents only as Mr Guillam. At the time, gay sexual activity in public places could lead to arrests by members of the Society for the Reformation of Manners. Often the authorities would wait outside the Lincoln's Inn bog house in London for example to catch people.

The courts heard that a man (Mr Guillam) had visited a toilet stall to relieve himself, when another male put his penis through a hole in the wall ("a Boy in the adjoyning Vault put his Privy-member through a Hole"). Mr Guillam, surprised by the action, fled the lavatory, only to be followed by the male who cried out that he would have had sex with him. Mr Guillam was then confronted by Mr Vaughan who, knowing Mr Guillam's innocence, threatened to turn him in to the police and reveal him to his wife if he did not pay him a sum of money.

According to the Routledge Dictionary of Modern American Slang, "glory hole" first appeared in print in 1949, when an anonymously published glossary, Swasarnt Nerf's Gay Girl's Guide, defined it as "[a] phallic size hole in partition between toilet booths. Sometimes used also for a mere peep-hole."

Another reference to glory holes appeared in Tearoom Trade: Impersonal Sex in Public Places, a controversial book published by sociologist Laud Humphreys in 1970, where he suggests the "tearoom", or bathroom stall, as a prime space for men to congregate for sexual fulfilment. It also appeared later in the 1977 book The Joy of Gay Sex.

Public glory holes started to fade in popularity as the decriminalization of homosexuality was introduced in many countries and concerns over HIV/AIDS changed gay culture. A 2001 study in the Journal of Homosexuality found that public glory holes remained popular among many gay men "simply because they find [them] exciting and/or convenient."

Despite the fading prominence of glory holes in public, some gay bath houses and sex clubs maintain the presence of glory holes in their establishments and some people have installed glory-hole walls in their own homes. Sexual activity in public toilets remains a fetish for a subset of gay men in particular, who engage in similarly anonymous acts below a toilet cubicle separator rather than through a hole in the wall.

In 2018, the Western Australian Museum added a "historic glory hole" to its collection. It had been situated in the toilet stall of the Albany Highway-side of the Gosnells train station, but was removed and saved in 1997 before the toilet was demolished.

The Leather Archives & Museum was loaned a glory hole from Man's Country in Chicago in June 2019.

A 2020 BuzzFeed article collected anecdotes from gay, straight and bisexual readers recounting their experiences with glory holes at swinger parties.

== Legal and health concerns ==
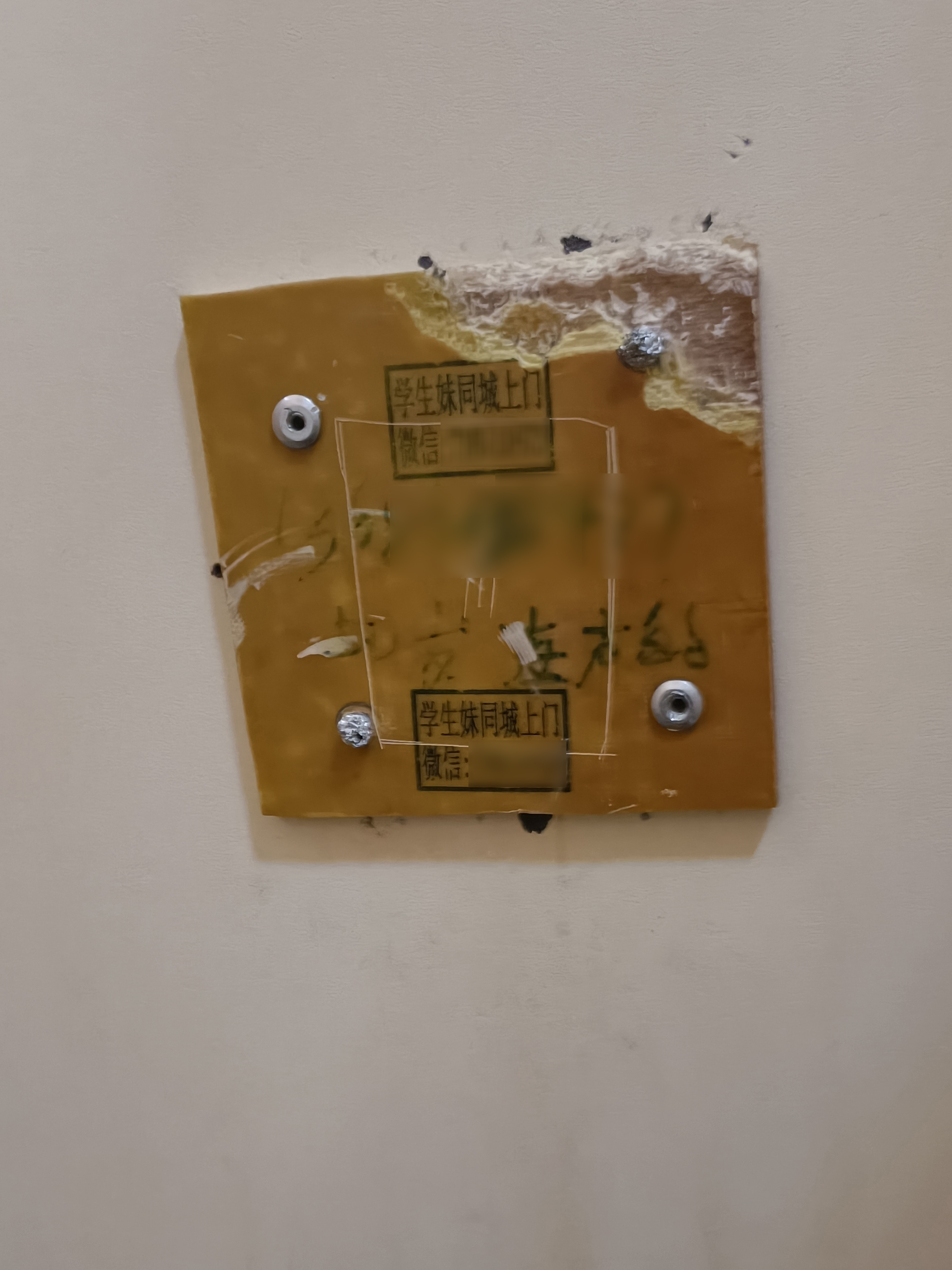
A blocked glory hole in Chengdu

Public sex of any kind is illegal in many parts of the world and police undercover operations continue to be used to enforce such laws. Adverse personal consequences to participants in glory hole activity have included police surveillance and public humiliation in the press, often with marital and employment consequences and imprisonment following a criminal conviction. Gay bashing, mugging and bodily injury are further potential risks. For reasons of personal safety, as well as etiquette, men typically wait for a signal from the receptive partner before inserting their genitals through a glory hole.

== In popular culture ==
Glory holes are a recurring theme in pornography. Straight porn often features scenarios involving them; in some instances, it involves kink mistresses, who see it as a form of women's sexual agency and mastery.

The early 20th-century pornographic cartoon Eveready Harton in Buried Treasure depicts the use of an improvised glory hole for zoophilic purposes.

American glam metal band Steel Panther's album All You Can Eat features a song entitled "Gloryhole", about the narrator's frequent visits to a local gloryhole.

== See also ==
- Cottaging – term referring to anonymous male–male sex in a public lavatory
- Gay bathhouse
- Gay beat
- Gay cruising in England and Wales
- Polari
- Troll (gay slang)
