= Queerstralia =

TV series

Queerstralia is an Australian documentary TV series about LGBT history in Australia that aired on ABC Television in 2023. The three episodes were hosted by comedian Zoe Coombs Marr.

== Synopsis ==
Over three episodes, the series combines comedic and documentary techniques to explore queer history of Australia. Over three one-hour episodes themed around belonging, identity and law, Coombs Marr covers everything from lesbian convict gangs to the gay bushranger Captain Moonlite; the 78ers and gay bashing at the first Sydney Gay and Lesbian Mardi Gras in 1978, and the AIDS response in Australia.

The series features interviews with comedian Hannah Gadsby, actor Magda Szubanski, historian Dr Yves Rees, activist Peter de Waal, former rugby league player Ian Roberts, feminist and filmmaker Barbara Creed, director Tony Ayres, and others.

The episodes were as follows:

- Episode 1: The Law
- Episode 2: Gender and Identity
- Episode 3: Community and Belonging

== Cast ==
- Zoë Coombs Marr
- Magda Szubanski
- Ian Roberts
- Nayuka Gorrie
- Rhys Nicholson
- Hannah Gadsby
- Georgie Stone
- Tony Ayres
- Narelda Jacobs
- Aunty Dawn Daylight
- Yves Rees
- Peter De Waal
- Todd Fernando
- Dino Hodge
- Dennis Altman
- Julie Peters
- Tony Briffa
- Nicholas Henderson
- Graham Willett
- Anthony Brandon Wong – narrator

== Production ==
Queerstralia was produced by Guesswork Television Production for the Australian Broadcasting Corporation. It was presented by Screen Australia. The series was hosted by comedian and self-proclaimed "professional lesbian" Zoe Coombs Marr and directed by Stamatia Maroupas

Interviews by Coombs Marr and interviewees featured various locations, such as The Peel in Collingwood; The Fox Hotel in Altona; and the Cascades Female Factory.

== Release ==
All three episodes of Queerstralia were released in 2023. Episode one, "The Law" featured on Gogglebox Australia.

== Critical reception ==
Michael Idato, of The Sydney Morning Herald, gave Queerstralia 4 out of 5 stars. Idato commended the series on "deliver[ing] a robust, and nicely irreverent, telling of Australia's queer history".

Queerstralia was a finalist in the Representation of LGBTQIA+ Non-Scripted category in the MIPCOM CANNES Diversify TV Awards.
