= Riot (2018 film) =

2018 television film by Jeffrey Walker

- Screenplay by: Greg Waters
- Story by: Carrie Anderson
- Directed by: Jeffrey Walker
- Starring: Damon Herriman; Kate Box; Xavier Samuel; Jessica De Gouw; Josh Quong Tart
- Composer: David Hirschfelder
- Country of origin: Australia
- Original language: English

Production
- Executive producers: Joanna Werner; Alastair McKinnon; Brett Sleigh
- Producers: Joanna Werner; Louise Smith
- Cinematography: Martin McGrath
- Editor: Geoff Lamb
- Running time: 105 minutes
- Production company: Werner Film Productions

Original release
- Network: ABC
- Release: February 25, 2018

Riot is an Australian drama television film that aired on ABC and ABC iview on February 25, 2018. The film is directed by Jeffrey Walker from a screenplay by Greg Waters and a story by Carrie Anderson. It stars Damon Herriman, Kate Box, Xavier Samuel, Jessica De Gouw, and Josh Quong Tart. It takes a look at the 1970s LGBT rights movement in Australia through the eyes of dedicated activist Lance Gowland.

The film marked the 40th anniversary of the birth of the Sydney Gay and Lesbian Mardi Gras. It was met with positive reviews, and won four AACTA Awards, including Best Telefeature or Miniseries, from eleven nominations. It was tied with Mystery Road as the most-nominated television program of that year's ceremony.

== Synopsis ==
In 1978, when the push to decriminalise homosexuality has stalled, a group of activists decide they must make one final attempt to celebrate who they are. Led by former union boss Lance Gowland, they get a police permit and spread the word. On a freezing winter's night, they cloak themselves in fancy dress, join hands, and parade down Oxford Street. But they have no idea that angry police lie in wait, and the courage they find that night will finally mobilise the nation.

== Cast ==
- Damon Herriman as Lance Gowland
- Kate Box as Marg McMann
- Xavier Samuel as Jim Walker
- Jessica De Gouw as Robyn Plaister
- Josh Quong Tart as Ron Austin
- Luke Mullins as Peter De Waal
- Eden Falk as Peter Bonsall-Boone
- Will McDonald as Jeremy
- Christian Byers as Murph
- Hanna Mangan-Lawrence as Gabrielle Antolovich
- Fern Sutherland as Sue Willis
- Max Cullen as Gerry Gowland
- Susan Prior as Norma Gowland
- Andrew McFarlane as Neville Wran
- Rob Carlton as Jack Mundey
- Heather Mitchell as Joan / Checkerboard Interviewer
- Jonny Hawkins as Ken
- Patrick Jhanur as Sweetpea
- Luke Fewster as Greg
- Mark Owen-Taylor as Rector
- Kate Cheel as Jenny
- Benedict Hardie as Hugh
- Pip Miller as Mr. Meagher
- George H. Xanthis as Constable Agostini
- Christopher Truswell as Constable Bennett
- Gerard Carroll as Constable Davidson
- Steve Le Marquand as Sergeant Evans
- Elliott Weston as Inspector Chambers
- Dominic McDonald as Constable Fraser
- Ashley Lyons as Keith
- Andrew Ryan as Shane
- Verushka Darling as Helen Back

== Production ==
Principal photography took place in and around Sydney, New South Wales. The film was shot in twenty days.

A great deal of discussion in pre-production regarding the visual style of Riot specifically focused on the huge nighttime scenes in Kings Cross, New South Wales. During production, the riot began at Kings Cross before seamlessly moving to mocked-up store fronts filmed at Fox Studios in Moore Park.

== Reception ==
=== Critical response ===
The film received positive reviews from critics, with particular praise for the performances of the cast, most notably those of Herriman and Box. Luke Buckmaster of the Daily Review gave it three-and-a-half stars out of five and wrote that "moments in Riot are refreshing, purely because they are oriented around voices rarely given narrative priority in mainstream entertainment."

=== Accolades ===
| Year | Award | Category | Recipient(s) | Result | Ref. |
|---|---|---|---|---|---|
| 2018 | Logie Awards | Most Outstanding Actor | Damon Herriman | Nominated | |
| 2018 | Logie Awards | Most Outstanding Actress | Kate Box | Nominated | |
| 2018 | ASSG Awards | Best Sound for a Television Drama or Comedy Series – Over 30 Minutes | Chris Goodes, Luke Millar, Nick Emond, Diego Ruiz, Sue Kerr, Jack Rodrigues, Mario Vaccaro, Michael Grisold, Lee Yee | Won | |
| 2018 | AACTA Awards | Best Telefeature or Mini Series | Joanna Werner, Louise Smith | Won | |
| 2018 | AACTA Awards | Best Lead Actor in a Television Drama | Damon Herriman | Won | |
| 2018 | AACTA Awards | Best Lead Actress in a Television Drama | Kate Box | Won | |
| 2018 | AACTA Awards | Best Guest or Supporting Actor in a Television Drama | Xavier Samuel | Nominated | |
| 2018 | AACTA Awards | Best Direction in a Television Drama or Comedy | Jeffrey Walker | Nominated | |
| 2018 | AACTA Awards | Best Screenplay in Television | Greg Waters | Nominated | |
| 2018 | AACTA Awards | Best Editing in Television | Geoff Lamb | Nominated | |
| 2018 | AACTA Awards | Best Original Music Score in Television | David Hirschfelder | Nominated | |
| 2018 | AACTA Awards | Best Production Design in Television | Pete Baxter | Nominated | |
| 2018 | AACTA Awards | Best Costume Design in Television | Xanthe Heubel | Nominated | |
| 2018 | AACTA Awards | Best Casting | Allison Meadows | Won | |
| 2018 | Ellie Awards | Best Editing in a Drama | Geoff Lamb | Nominated | |
| 2019 | Equity Ensemble Awards | Outstanding Performance by an Ensemble in a Mini-series or Telemovie | Damon Herriman, Kate Box, Xavier Samuel, Jessica De Gouw, Josh Quong Tart | Won | |
