= LGBTQ history in Australia =

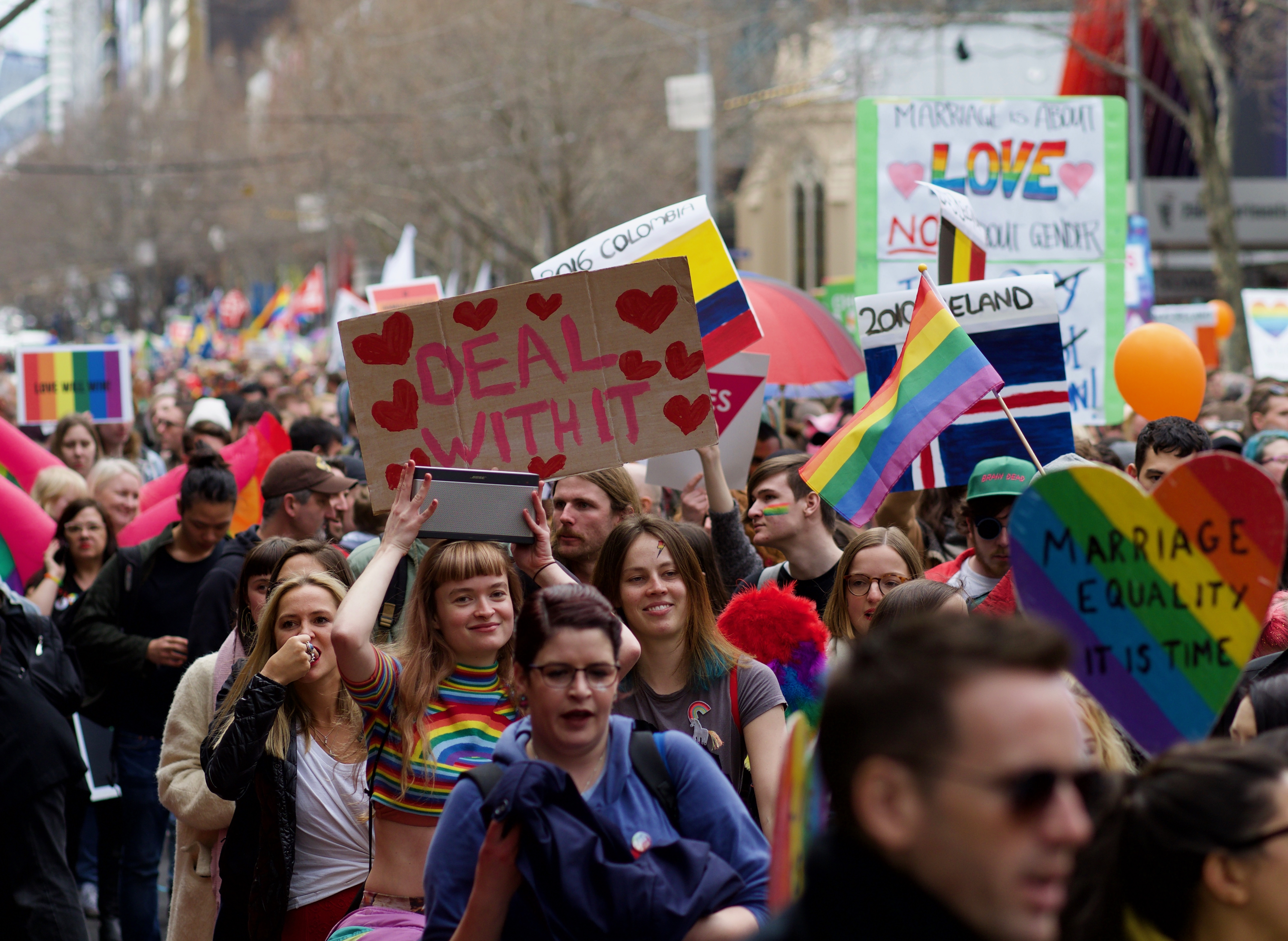
Rally for Marriage Equality in Melbourne, August 2017

This article details the history of the LGBTQ rights movement in Australia, from the colonial era to the present day.

== Pre-colonialism ==
Whilst identifying as LGBTQ is not uncommon amongst Indigenous Australians today, the records regarding it being a phenomenon in pre-colonial Australian societies were actively suppressed by white missionaries in the past, making it incredibly difficult to find well documented instances of it. However, that is not to say there are none. Oral histories passed down through indigenous communities tie in tales of such things, which in private collections have also been depicted in song, art, and stories.

One such story is of "Mimi" spirits, which, "...depending on the community you're talking to," says Troy-Anthony Baylis, (PhD candidate, University of South Australia,) in an SBS article, "...are genderless beings not bound by the accruement of human definition." The Catholic Church during colonisation enforced heterocentric ideals on indigenous communities so it is difficult to find official records of it today, which is further exacerbated by systemic repression of the accounts of such individuals.

Doctor Todd Fernando, who in 2021 was Australia's Victoria Commisioner for LGBTQA+ Communities, published A Desire to Flourish: The Social and Cultural Factors Shaping the Health and Identity of Queer Indigenous Australians which states, "While the histories of queerness are absent from the dominant narratives in the histories of colonisation and postcolonial Australia, the fact remains that there is evidence of long-lasting sexual and gender diversity."

Former Victoria LGBTIQ+ Commisioner, then Treaty Commisioner in New South Whales, Professor Todd Fernando is now the Head of the School of Indigenous Australian Studies at Charles Sturt University, continuing his work addressing the underrepresentation of Indigenous and LGBTQ perspectives in Australian History.

Anthropologists Bill Stanner, Norman Tindale, A. P. Elkin and Ralph Piddington found evidence of polygamy and other non-binary behaviours.

A more known documented instance of this is in the Tiwi Islands. While there is not a lot of evidence that there were formal structures and formal roles within mainland Aboriginal communities in the Tiwi Islands, language that names sexual and gender diversity exists, and there is evidence that there were roles that were quite set out.

== Colonial period to 1951 ==
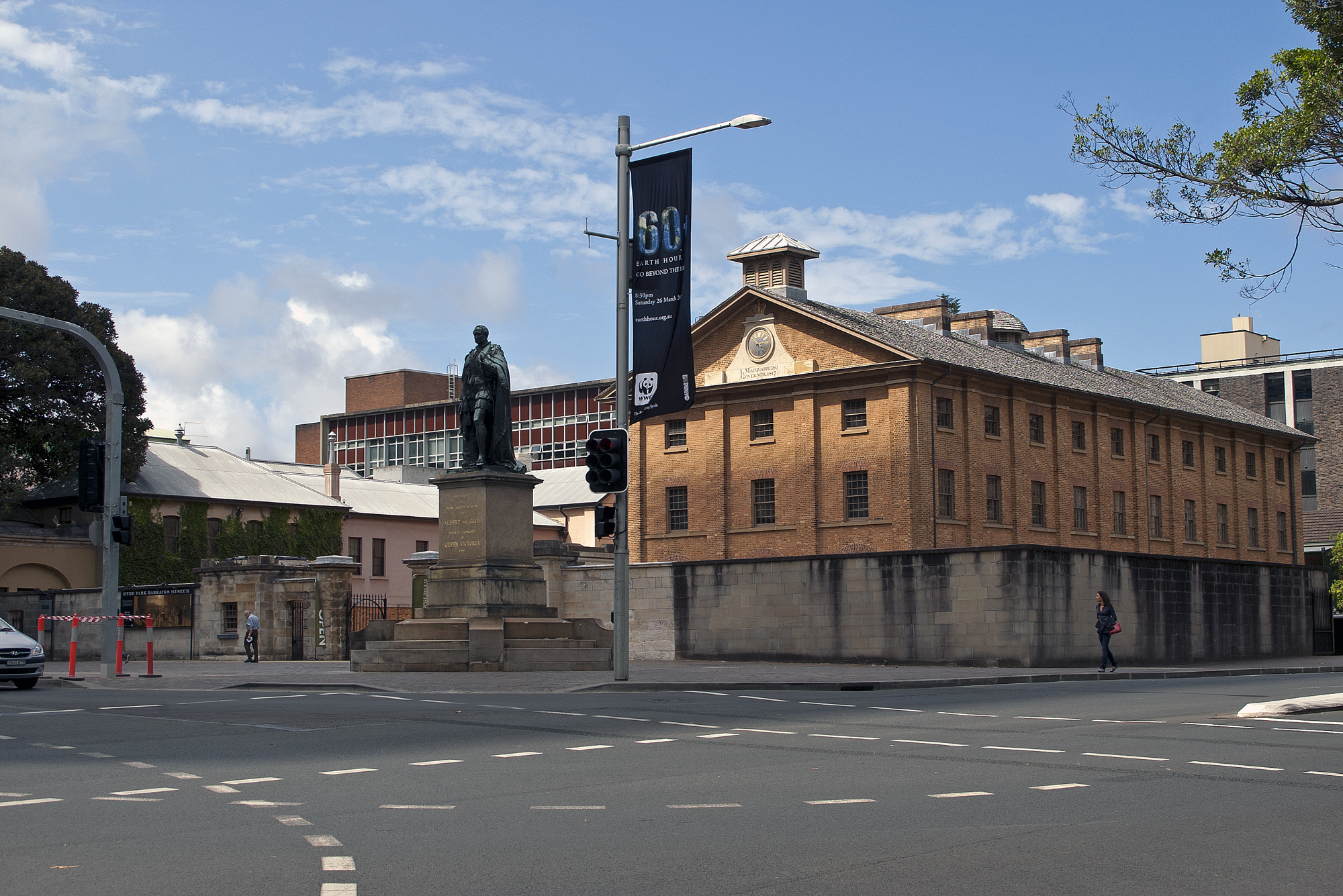
The Hyde Park Barracks in Sydney, where some convicts identified themselves with female names

Early laws in Australia were based on then-current laws in Britain, which were inherited upon colonisation in 1788. Lesbianism was never illegal in Britain nor its colonies, including Australia. Sodomy laws, however, were part of Australian law, from 1788 through to 1994 under Human Rights (Sexual Conduct) Act 1994. The punishment for "buggery" (sodomy) was reduced from execution to life in prison in 1899.

Throughout the transportation period there was a severe imbalance between the sexes, convict and free, and large numbers of convicts were kept in relative or complete isolation from the other sex. Homosexual behaviour was prevalent among Europeans in colonial Australia; Historian Robert Aldrich suggests that sodomy became more common in the 1820s and 1830s. Some historians have suggested that anti-sodomy rhetoric was utilised effectively against the practice of transportation, contributing to its eventual conclusion in the 1840s, although the emergence of gold mining also led to an increase in free migration and settlement.

In 1796 Francis Wilkinson became the first man to be charged with buggery (but acquitted). Class differences appear to have been involved in tolerance and indulgence of gay sex amongst convicts, with little attention paid by working-class convicts, but condemnation from middle-class or upwardly mobile transportees.

In 1822 an official inquiry into the sexual scandal that resulted from the movement of thirty female prisoners to the male prison farm at Emu Plains reported the rumour that the women had been placed there to prevent "unnatural crimes" on the part of the men.

In a secret dispatch of 1843 the Lieutenant Governor of Van Diemen's Land stated that women in the Hobart female factory have "their Fancy-women, or lovers, to who they are attached with as much ardour as they would be to the opposite sex, and practice onanism to the greatest extent".

Select committees of the British Parliament inquiring into racism in 1832 and 1837 heard much evidence of the prevalence of scandalism. Major James Mudie testified that the prisoners called each other "sods" and that at Hyde Park Barracks in Sydney boy prisoners went by names such as Kitty and Nancy.

In 1932, an Australian tabloid, The Arrow, described the growth of the "pervert population" of Brisbane, largely men aged 18 to 25, whose activities presented "a scandal of evil almost unprecedented". It called for police action to suppress and end their gatherings. It reported clandestine weddings between gay men there: "In the last two weeks there have been two 'weddings'—ghastly, horrifying spectacles of painted men and primping lads united in a sacrilegious blasphemy that they call the 'bonds of matrimony'."

In 1951, the New South Wales Crimes Act was amended to ensure that "buggery" remained a criminal act "with or without the consent of the person", removing legal loophole of consent. The government of J.J. Cahill increased arrests of male homosexuals and reopened a prison at Cooma exclusively for gay prisoners in 1957. In 1958, the Cahill government appointed a committee led by British psychiatrist Bill Trethowan to inquire into the "causes and treatment of homosexuality".

== 20th century gay rights movement ==
While Britain's influence on Australian political culture was still strong in the fifties there was no local appetite for a political response to the Wolfenden Committee, which recommended the decriminalisation of male homosexuality in Britain in 1957. Ten years later there was little comment from any Australian public figure (state or federal) when Britain finally decriminalised homosexuality in England and Wales. Some historians have attributed this to the association of homosexuality with the 'convict stain'.

However, it was in the wake of decriminalisation in Britain that the first Australian gay and lesbian rights groups were organised. The ACT Homosexual Law Reform Society, a Canberra-based organisation formed in mid 1969; and an Australian arm of the Daughters of Bilitis, formed in Melbourne in January 1970, are considered Australia's first gay rights organisations. Although, it was a Sydney organisation, the Campaign Against Moral Persecution (CAMP), founded in 1970, that was to gain the most public attention.

CAMP set out to publicly campaign for political and social change, rather than focusing on law reform. This was apparent when activists John Ware and Christobell Poll announced its formation in an article on the front page of the magazine section of The Australian newspaper on 19 September 1970. CAMP was officially launched on 6 February 1971, at the first public gathering of gay women and men in Australia, which took place in a church hall in Balmain. Within 12 months local CAMP groups had formed in each capital city, creating an informal gay rights network around Australia.

CAMP's first demonstration took place in October 1971 outside the Liberal Party of Australia headquarters in Sydney when a right-wing Christian fundamentalist stood against Tom Hughes for pre-selection. Hughes was the federal Liberal Attorney-General and had spoken out in favour of limited homosexual law reform, so CAMP mounted a demonstration. In January 1971, the Melbourne-based gay rights organisation Society Five was formed, inspired by CAMP, and was to become the largest gay organisation in Australia during the 1970s.

The emergence of this movement in the early 1970s was aided by the growing visibility of the gay and lesbian community in the Australian media. Reform of Australia's tough censorship rules by then Minister for Customs and Excise, Don Chipp, meant that by the early 1970s gay and lesbian content was no longer automatically censored. In February 1970 the first gay themed Australian film The Set was released. While in October 1970 ABC TV's This Day Tonight broadcast an interview with a lesbian couple featuring the first same-sex kiss seen on Australian television. Further exposure occurred when another ABC TV's Chequerboard program broadcast an interview with a gay couple in February 1972 and Australian TV soap opera Number 96 introduced the first sympathetic gay character, Don Finlayson, to local audiences.

This visibility and increasing publicity around the emergence of gay and lesbian groups in major Australian cities soon encouraged more groups to form. Additional gay and lesbian rights organisations included The Gay Teachers Group, and The Homosexual Law Reform Coalition, all gay rights organisations which started in the late 1970s. In May 1973 Australia's first LGBTI focused social service Phone-a-Friend was established in Sydney, which in 1978 saw the launch of Australia's first gay focused news publications The Sydney Star Observer.

However, homosexual law reform first occurred in South Australia, not New South Wales or Victoria. In 1972, in response to public outrage at the murder of University of Adelaide academic Dr. George Duncan, the Dunstan Labor government introduced a consenting adults in private type reform bill. This led to a later more comprehensive reform bill introduced by Murray Hill, father of former defence minister Robert Hill. In 1975, South Australia became the first Australian state to legalise sexual conduct between consenting adult males. This action prompted other Australian jurisdictions to debate law reform for the first time, with the Australian Capital Territory following the South Australian lead in 1976.

In 1973 the Pink Bans were carried out by the Builders Laborers Federation to protest discrimination against gay people by universities in Sydney.

In October 1973 the Australian Parliament passed a motion in favour of the decriminialization of homosexual acts between consenting adults in private. While at the same time, the Australian Medical Association removed homosexuality from its list of illnesses and disorders, two months before the American Psychiatric Association did the same. Following in the wake of South Australia and the ACT the other Australian states and territories reformed their laws between 1976 and 1991. The exception was Tasmania, which retained its laws until the federal government forced their repeal in 1997.

It was in this context that an estimated 500 people marched to and rallied in Martin Place in Sydney on 24 June 1978. Organisers said the march and rally were part of "international homosexual solidarity day" to demonstrate against sexual repression in Australia and other countries. Police attacked a late night street party or Mardi Gras that night and arrested 53 revelers. This response, coupled with the publication of the names of the activists arrested in the local press over the next few days, attracted considerable public sympathy and led to this event becoming an annual community event, the Sydney Gay and Lesbian Mardi Gras, which celebrated its 30th anniversary in 2008. It also inspired similar events in other cities like Melbourne and Perth.

Law reform and the emergence of visible gay and lesbian communities did not however lead to the end of police harassment of individuals, which would continue into the 1990s. The last gay man was arrested on 14 December 1984 in Hobart, Tasmania, when he was found engaging in sexual conduct with another man on the side of the road in a car. He was sentenced to eight months jail.

In 1991, after consistent pressure from Gay and Lesbian Immigration Task Force (GLITF), the Migration Amendment Act (No. 2) 1991 (Cth) was passed, amending the Migration Act 1958 (Cth) to allow Australian Citizens and Permanent Residents to sponsor their same-sex partners to Australia through a new Interdependency Visa.

In 1994, the Commonwealth passed the Human Rights (Sexual Conduct) Act 1994, section four of which legalised sexual activity between consenting adults (in private) throughout Australia. It was not until 1997 however when the law in Tasmania prohibiting gay male sexual conduct was repealed. The ban on gay male sexual conduct was overturned in the courts in 1996 following Toonen v. Australia that gay male sexual conduct became formally legal in all Australian states and territories when the federal government passed the Human Rights (Sexual Conduct) Act 1994.

== Howard government ==
Since the beginning of his term as prime minister of Australia in 1996, John Howard made his position clear on the gay rights issue. In January 1997, Howard refused to offer a message of support to Sydney Gay & Lesbian Mardi Gras and said on the TV program A Current Affair that he would be "disappointed" if one of his children were to tell him they were gay or lesbian. In August 2001 when asked in a Triple J interview where he placed himself on a scale of acceptance of homosexuality, one end being total acceptance and the other total rejection, Howard replied, "Oh I'd place myself somewhere in the middle. I certainly don't think you should give the same status to homosexual liaisons as you give to marriage, I don't."

In July 1996 the Howard government reduced the number of interdependency visas, making migration for same-sex couples more difficult.

Reported in 2003, the government was pushed into permitting passports with an 'X' sex marker by Alex MacFarlane. This was stated by the West Australian to be on the basis of a challenge by MacFarlane, using an "indeterminate" birth certificate issued by the State of Victoria. Australian government policy between 2003 and 2011 was to issue passports with an 'X' marker only to people who could "present a birth certificate that notes their sex as indeterminate".

The UN Human Rights Commission declared Australia's federal government in violation of equality and privacy rights under the International Covenant of Civil and Political Rights in September 2003 after it had denied a man a de facto spouse veteran's pension based on his 38-year same-sex relationship. The request from the UN that Australia take steps to treat same sex couples equally was ignored. When directly questioned, Attorney General Philip Ruddock said that the government is not bound by the ruling.

In March 2004, Howard condemned Australia's first laws which would allow gay couples to adopt children in the ACT as part of a new ACT Bill of Rights. Howard said, "I think the idea of the ACT having a bill of rights is ridiculous. I'm against gay adoption, just as I'm against gay marriage." The Commonwealth, however, did not overturn the legislation.

On 27 May 2004, approximately two months after Tony Blair's Labour Government in Britain proposed its Civil Partnership Act 2004, federal Attorney-General Philip Ruddock introduced the Marriage Legislation Amendment Bill to prevent any possible court rulings allowing same-sex marriages or civil unions. In August 2004, same-sex marriage was officially prohibited when the Marriage Act 1961 and the Family Law Act were amended in order to define marriage as a "union of a man and a woman to the exclusion of all others, voluntarily entered into for life". Amendments were also made to prevent the recognition in Australia of marriages conducted in other countries between a man and another man or a woman and another woman.

The passage of the legislation was made possible because the Australian Labor Party supported the Howard government's proposed ban on same-sex marriages at the time.

== State and territory initiatives ==
In March 2006, after the ACT government announced plans to create civil unions within the territory, the federal government vowed to block it. Following the public outcry over Howard's move to kill the ACT bill, in April the Human Rights and Equal Opportunity Commission (HREOC) began a six-month inquiry to hear from Australians about the federal government's treatment of gays. The Howard government banned its departments from making submissions to the inquiry into financial discrimination experienced by same-sex couples.

In May 2006, Attorney General Philip Ruddock blocked a gay Australian man from marrying in Europe. Ruddock refused to grant a gay man living in the Netherlands a 'Certificate of No Impediment to Marriage' document required by some European countries before marriage, to prove foreigners are in fact single. Under Ruddock's instructions, no such documents were to be released to gay and lesbians individuals intending to marry overseas. Following a request for the certificate the following statement was received:

Following the advice of the Australian Attorney-General's Department we herewith certify that Australian law does not allow the issue of a Certificate of No Impediment to Marriage to persons wishing to enter into a same-sex marriage.

— Australian Embassy, Netherlands on behalf of the Attorney-General's Office

In June 2006, the ACT's civil union legislation was passed by the ACT Legislative Assembly however the law was subsequently disallowed by the Governor General on instruction from the Howard government. A second attempt to legislate for civil unions for same-sex couples in 2007 was again disallowed.

In 2007, following the successful same-sex adoption of a boy in Western Australia by two gay men the Howard government made plans to introduce a federal bill, The Family Law (Same Sex Adoption) Bill, which sought to prevent same-sex couples from adopting. The idea was taken off the legislative agenda after the 2007 election, which Coalition government lost.

Despite the reluctance of the federal government, individual states and territories were continuing to make inroads towards same-sex marriage. Since 2001, Victoria has amended 60 Acts to advance same-sex marriage. In 2002, Western Australia removed all remaining legislative discrimination toward sexual orientation (including adoption) by adding the new definition of "de facto partner", and Queensland created a new, non-discriminatory definition of "de facto partner" within 61 pieces of legislation. In 2003, Tasmania became the first state to create a relationship registry for same sex couples, giving same-sex couples nearly equal rights to married couples, excluding adoption. In 2004, the Northern Territory removed legislative discrimination against same-sex couples in most areas of territory law, and the ACT began allowing same-sex couples to adopt. In 2005, the city of Sydney, in New South Wales, created a Relationship Declaration Program offering limited legal recognition for same-sex couples. In 2006, South Australia, the last state to recognise same-sex couples, amended 97 Acts, dispensing with the term "de facto" and categorising couples as "domestic partners". The city of Melbourne, in Victoria, provided a "Relationship Declaration Register" for all relationships and carers starting in 2007, which was followed in December with Victoria introducing a statewide registry and amending 69 pieces of legislation to include couples who are in registered relationships.

== Major reforms in the 2010s ==
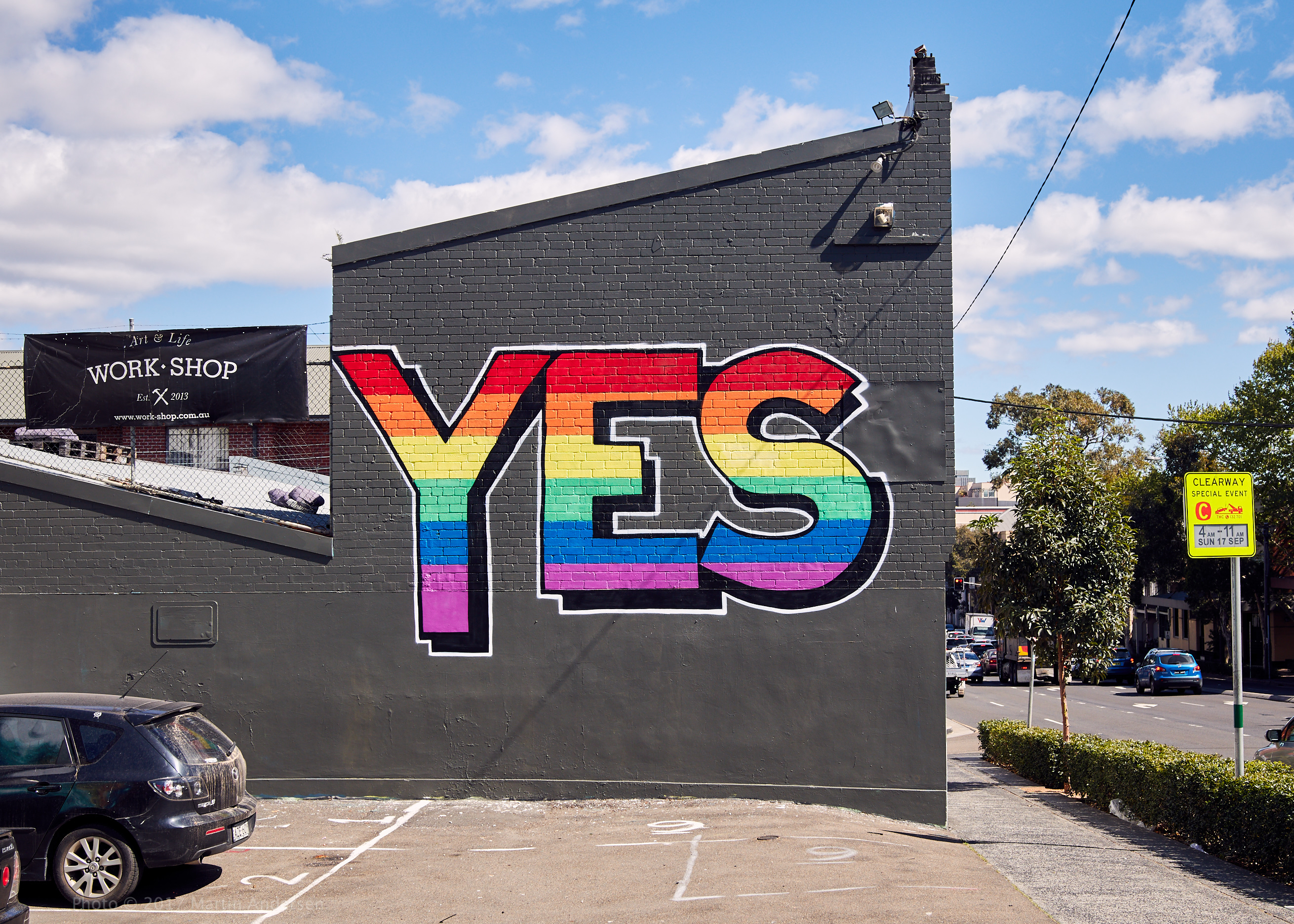
A wall with the signage "Yes" painted in the colours of the LGBT flag, designed to demonstrate the support for Australia's Marriage Equality survey from 2017. Advertising in Australian media frequently used the phrase "Australia said yes" in response to the survey result.

By the late 2000s and early 2010s, support for LGBT rights in Australia generally grew, and a number of significant legal achievements were made. Nationwide equalisation with respect to the age of consent laws was achieved when Queensland amended the law in 2016. The decade was also marked by the implementation of expungement schemes in many states and territories, which allowed men who had been charged with anti-homosexuality laws to apply to have their convictions removed from the record. As of November 2018, all of the eight states and territories have passed expungement laws.

States and territories, with the exception of South Australia, also abolished the use of the gay panic defence in common law and the first nationwide anti-discrimination law was passed by the Federal Parliament in the form of the Sex Discrimination Amendment (Sexual Orientation, Gender Identity and Intersex Status) Act 2013, the provisions of which extended to intersex people. Significantly, adoption laws were amended in six states and territories (New South Wales 2010; Tasmania 2013; Victoria 2015; Queensland 2016; South Australia 2017; Northern Territory 2018) to allow same-sex couples the right to adopt children. South Australia's amendment of assisted reproduction laws in 2016 ensured same-sex couples had equal access to these methods in all jurisdictions. By 2018, all states and territories, with the exception of Western Australia and the Northern Territory, had implemented a relationships registration scheme, which allowed couples to demonstrate proof of the existence of a de facto relationship for the purpose of federal law. Some of these laws included the option for a couple to have a formal, state-sanctioned ceremony. Queensland made history in this regard by legislating for civil unions twice in the decade, once in 2011 and again in 2016 after the intervening Newman LNP Government had repealed the legislation in 2012.

Transgender people in the Australian Capital Territory, the Northern Territory, South Australia, Tasmania and Western Australia also benefited from landmark reforms which allowed them to change their gender marker on their birth certificate, irrespective of whether or not they had undergone sexual reassignment surgery, though this was rejected by the Victorian Parliament in 2016. Arguably the most significant reform in the transgender space was a November 2017 ruling from the Family Court of Australia which allowed transgender children to access cross-sex hormone treatment (known as "stage 2 treatment") without court approval needing to be sought, in cases where there is no dispute between a child, their parents, and their treating doctors, hormone treatment can be prescribed without court permission.

In the relationships recognition space, federal law would be critical. The Federal Parliament's reforms of de facto recognition in 2008/09, spearheaded by the Rudd government, would amend 85 pieces of Commonwealth legislation to allow same-sex couples equal access to a range of areas including taxation, superannuation, health, social security, aged care and child support, immigration, citizenship and veterans' affairs. In time however, glaring examples of deficiencies between de facto relationships and marriages would be identified, enhancing the momentum for same-sex marriage. Same-sex marriage legislation would fail 22 times in the Federal Parliament between 2004 and 2017, most notably in September 2012 when legislation was rejected by large majorities in both houses of Parliament, despite the Gillard Labor government agreeing to a conscience vote on the issue. In 2017, the Turnbull Liberal/National government, having been denied the opportunity to hold a plebiscite, succeeded in conducting a voluntary postal survey on same-sex marriage, which resulted in a 61.6% "Yes" vote in favour of legalisation. Consequently, the Federal Parliament passed a law amending the Marriage Act 1961 to allow same-sex couples to marry in December 2017.

== 2020s ==
In Queensland April 2022, Katter's Australian Party Robbie Katter said he will move a bill to ban transgender athletes from women's sport in the state. In May 2022, he proposed a motion which was voted down 49 votes to 33. The opposition Liberal National Party of Queensland voted with him.

On 1 May 2024, Cumberland City Council voted in favour of removing a book about same-sex parenting from council libraries. The motion was proposed by Councillors Christou and Garrard and passed with 6 votes in favour and 5 against. The state Government's Arts Minister John Graham threatened to cut funding for the Council's libraries due to this motion against same-sex books passing.

On 15 May 2024, Cumberland City Council voted in favour of a motion to rescind the initial book ban.

In January 2025, Queensland announced an immediate pause on the prescription of puberty blockers (Stage 1 treatment) and cross-sex hormones (Stage 2 treatment) for new patients under 18 with gender dysphoria in Queensland's public health services. The policy, the first such ban in an Australian state.

== In sport ==
In 1982, the first LGBTQI football team, the Adelaide Armpits, played their first season in Adelaide, and continued to play in South Australian competitions for 30 years.

== See also ==
- Australian Marriage Law Postal Survey
- LGBT rights in Australia
