= LGBTQ culture in Sydney =

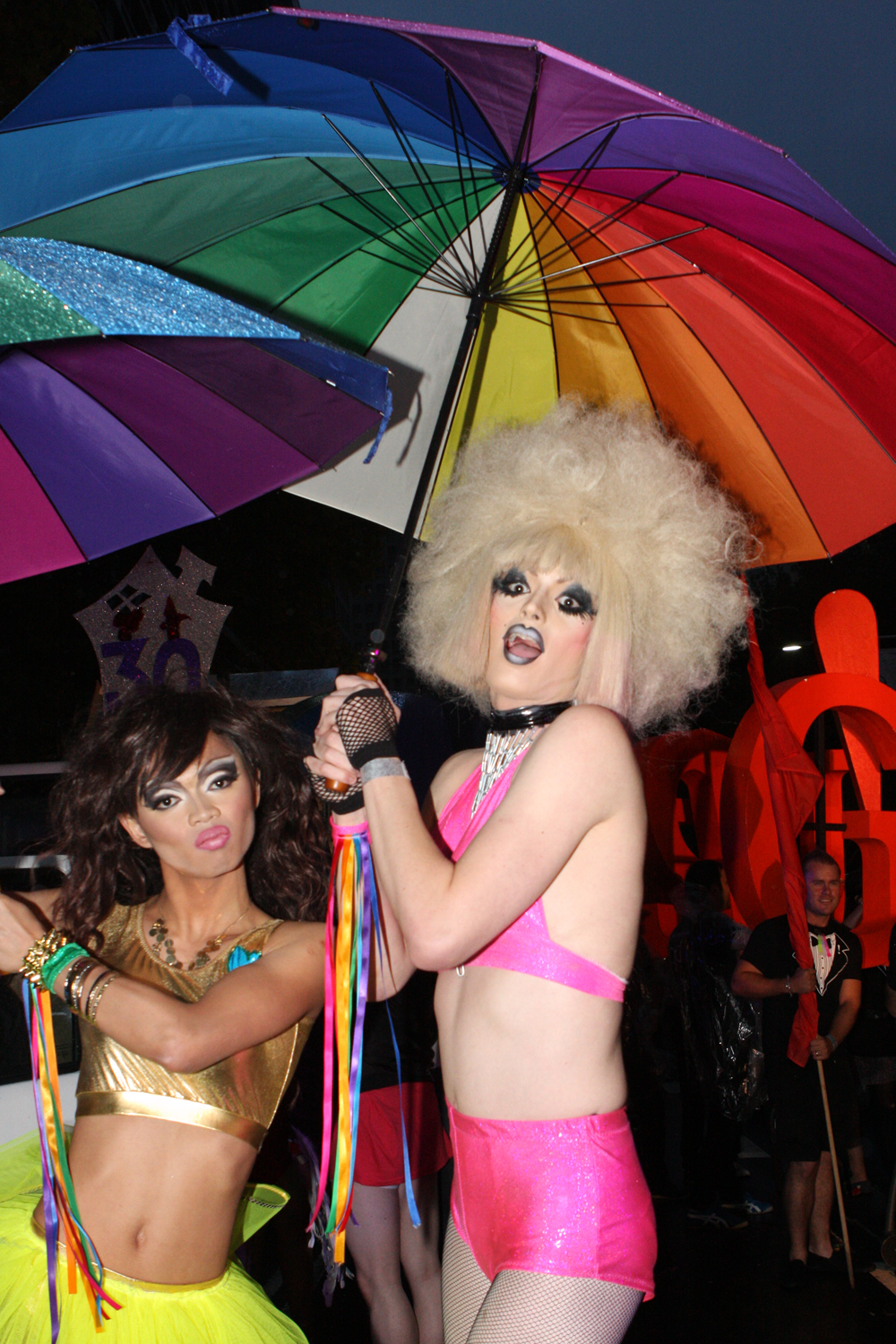
Participants in the 2012 Sydney Gay and Lesbian Mardi Gras

The LGBT community of Sydney, in New South Wales, is the largest in Australia. In a 2013 Pew Research poll, 79% of Australians agreed that homosexuality should be accepted by society, making it the fifth most supportive country in the survey behind Spain (88%), Germany (87%), Canada and the Czech Republic (both 80%). With a long history of LGBT rights activism and the annual three-week-long Sydney Gay and Lesbian Mardi Gras festival, Sydney is one of the most gay-friendly cities in Australia and in the world.

== History ==
Since the colonisation of Australia in 1788 with the landing of the First Fleet at Sydney Cove and raising of the Union Flag by Arthur Phillip Sydney has been associated with male homosexuality. As part of the British Empire, Australian colonies inherited anti-homosexuality laws such as the Buggery Act 1533. These provisions were maintained in criminal sodomy laws passed by 19th century colonial parliaments, and subsequently by state parliaments after Federation. Same-sex sexual activity between men was considered a capital crime, resulting in the execution of people convicted of sodomy until 1890. The laws also punished sodomy between heterosexual partners, but did not apply to lesbian relationships. Oral sex as well as masturbation, whether heterosexual or homosexual, public or private, were also criminal offences.

Governor Phillip made it clear to the early convicts that

There are two crimes that would merit death – murder and sodomy. For either of these crimes I would wish to confine the criminal till an opportunity offered of delivering him as a prisoner to the natives of New Zealand, and let them eat him.

By 1796, the first cases of homosexuality were being reported and the first trial for sodomy, that of Francis Wilkinson took place. Over 30 years later, in 1828, Alexander Brown was the first person hanged for sodomy. Different jurisdictions gradually began to reduce the death penalty for sodomy to life imprisonment, with Victoria the last state to reduce the penalty in 1949. Community debate about decriminalising homosexual activity began in the 1960s, with the first lobby groups Daughters of Bilitis, the Homosexual Law Reform Society and the Campaign Against Moral Persecution formed in 1969 and 1970.

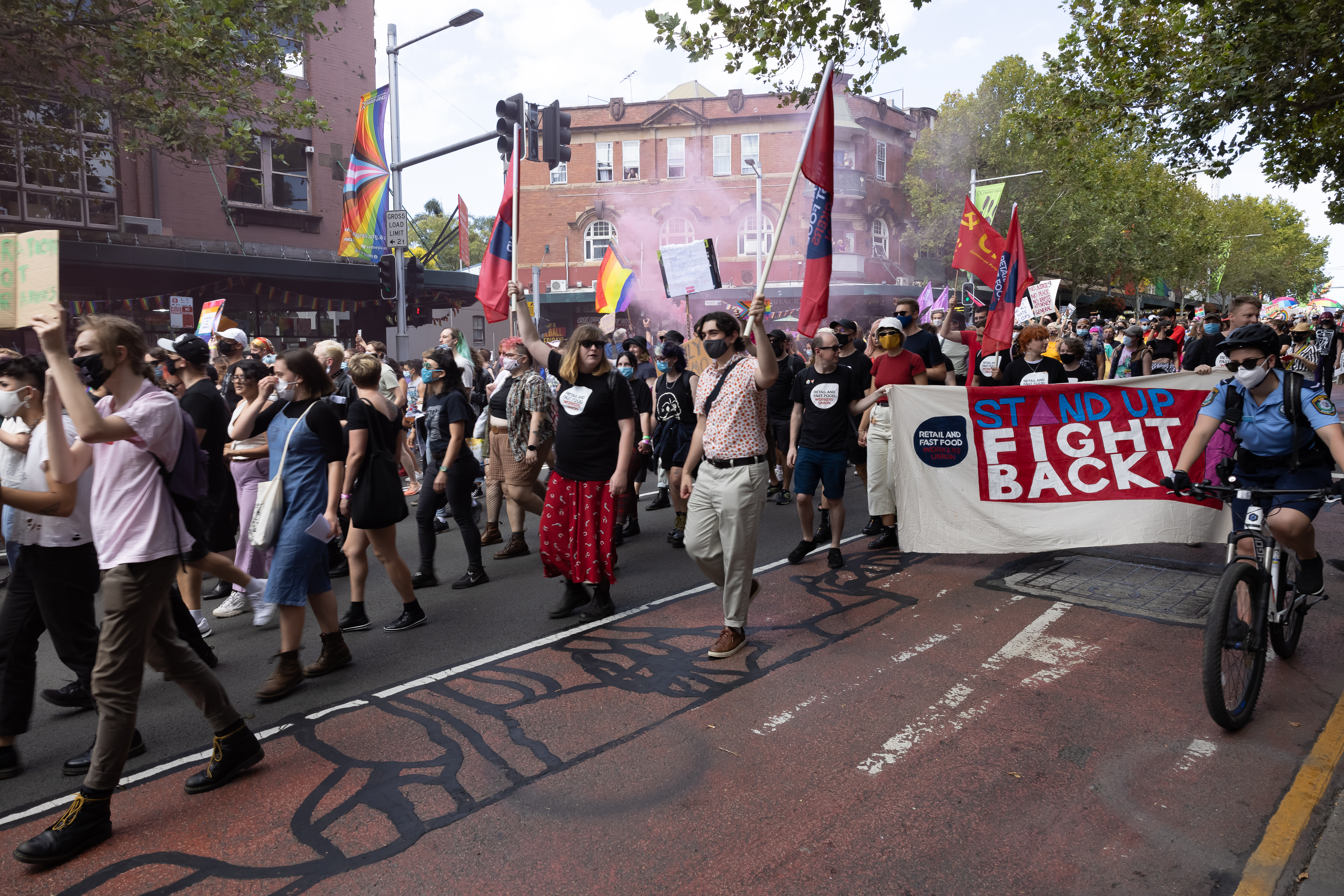
Pride protests along Oxford Street, 2021

=== Twentieth Century ===
While Britain's influence on Australian political culture was still strong in the fifties there was no local appetite for a political response to the Wolfenden Committee, which recommended the decriminalisation of male homosexuality in Britain in 1957. Ten years later there was little comment from any Australian public figure (state or federal) when Britain finally de-criminalized homosexuality in England and Wales. Some historians have attributed this to the association of homosexuality with the 'convict stain'

in October 1973, former Prime Minister John Gorton put forward a motion in the federal House of Representatives that "in the opinion of this House homosexual acts between consenting adults in private should not be subject to the criminal law". All three major parties were given a conscience vote, and the motion was passed by 64 votes to 40.

=== LGBTQIA+ demonstrations in Sydney in the 1970's ===
The first LGBTQIA+ demonstration in Australia was organised by CAMP (Campaign Against Moral Persecution) and occurred on the 6th of October 1971. CAMP, which had first been established in 1970, organised the protest to take place outside the Liberal Party’s Sydney headquarters in the Sydney CBD and around 70 people turned up to protest in support of Tom Hughes, a pre-selection candidate who supported homosexual law reform.

Following this first demonstration in October 1971, CAMP continued to participate in further demonstrations for law reform challenging discrimination against the LGBTQIA+ community.

In July 1973 another LGBTQIA+ group, Sydney's Gay Liberation, came up with the idea for a Gay Pride festival to be held over one week in Sydney and they spoke about their ideas for the festival in their August 1973 issue of the Sydney Gay Liberation newsletter and after contacting groups in Melbourne, Brisbane, and Adelaide similar LGBTQIA+ festivals also occurred in these cities. The festival in Sydney took place in September, and it included a festival in the Domain, a public meeting and a speak out. The final event at the end of the week was a demonstration which included about 200 LGBTQIA+ people who marched from Sydney Town Hall to Martin Place and the 200 participants held black and pink balloons, banners and streamers and yelled out chants including "Out of the beats and onto the streets" and a total of 18 people were charged for taking part in the demonstration.

It has been commented that " ...the events of 1973, with its melding of pride and politics, formed the model on which Mardi Gras and similar pride festivals around Australia are based."

=== The beginning of the Sydney Gay and Lesbian Mardi Gras ===
Participants in the first Sydney Gay and Lesbian Mardi Gras standing on the back of the sound truck during the night time celebration that was held in June 1978. As the sound truck and the march made its way down Oxford st, Darlinghurst toward Hyde park the size of the crowd increased to 1,500 as people came out of bars and clubs and joined in.

The first Sydney Gay and Lesbian Mardi Gras occurred on the 24 June 1978 and it consisted of a series of events that called for an end to discrimination against homosexuals in employment and housing, an end to police harassment and the repeal of all anti-homosexual laws and these events included a morning protest march in commemoration of the Stonewall riots as part of a global network of Gay Solidarity events as well as a night-time celebration that began on Oxford street in Darlinghurst.

Ken Davis one of the organisers and participants in these events has described what occurred on that day as follows "We sought and received police permission and hired a modest sound truck. Press publicity for gay liberation and the planned Mardi Gras was prominent in the campus and socialist newspapers, and in the then-progressive Australian. The organisers relied on letters to groups, phone calls, posters, leaflets and word-of-mouth. The Saturday morning march from Town Hall to Martin Place with 500 people was larger than any previous gay protest in Australia... ...By 10.30 pm, outside the court at Taylor Square on a cold night, we were unsure if we could get critical mass for our experiment in celebration, but eventually we set off with the small sound truck..." and as the group marched down Oxford street towards Hyde Park, the number of people rose to around 1,500 as revellers in Oxford Street bars and clubs responded to the call "Out of the bars and into the streets!".

Ken Davis further comments that "...Apart from the truck, there were no typical protest placards or banners. Only a small percentage of participants were dressed in carnival costumes..." and then "...the police decided to not observe the permit... ...The police pushed the parade fast down Oxford Street and arrested Lance Gowland, the driver of the sound truck, to prevent the planned dispersal into Hyde Park, so the 1500-strong crowd spontaneously marched down College Street and up William Street to Kings Cross. By the time the crowd was dispersing near El Alamein Fountain..." in Kings Cross 53 people were arrested. Two people who were arrested were fined. The rest were released without bail and the charges dismissed.

Although most charges were eventually dropped, The Sydney Morning Herald published the names of those arrested in full, leading to many people being outed to their friends and places of employment and many of those arrested lost their jobs as homosexuality was a crime in New South Wales until 1984.

The police response to a legal, local minority protest transformed it into a nationally significant event which stimulated gay rights and law reform campaigns and it has been commented by Ken Davis that "...the first gay Mardi Gras... ...on Saturday 24 June 1978 was a pivotal moment... ... [as] Though there had been gay and lesbian groups and protests after 1970, for the first time gay and lesbian rights became a significant public issue, creating a momentum for reforms."

=== Gay Neighbourhoods ===
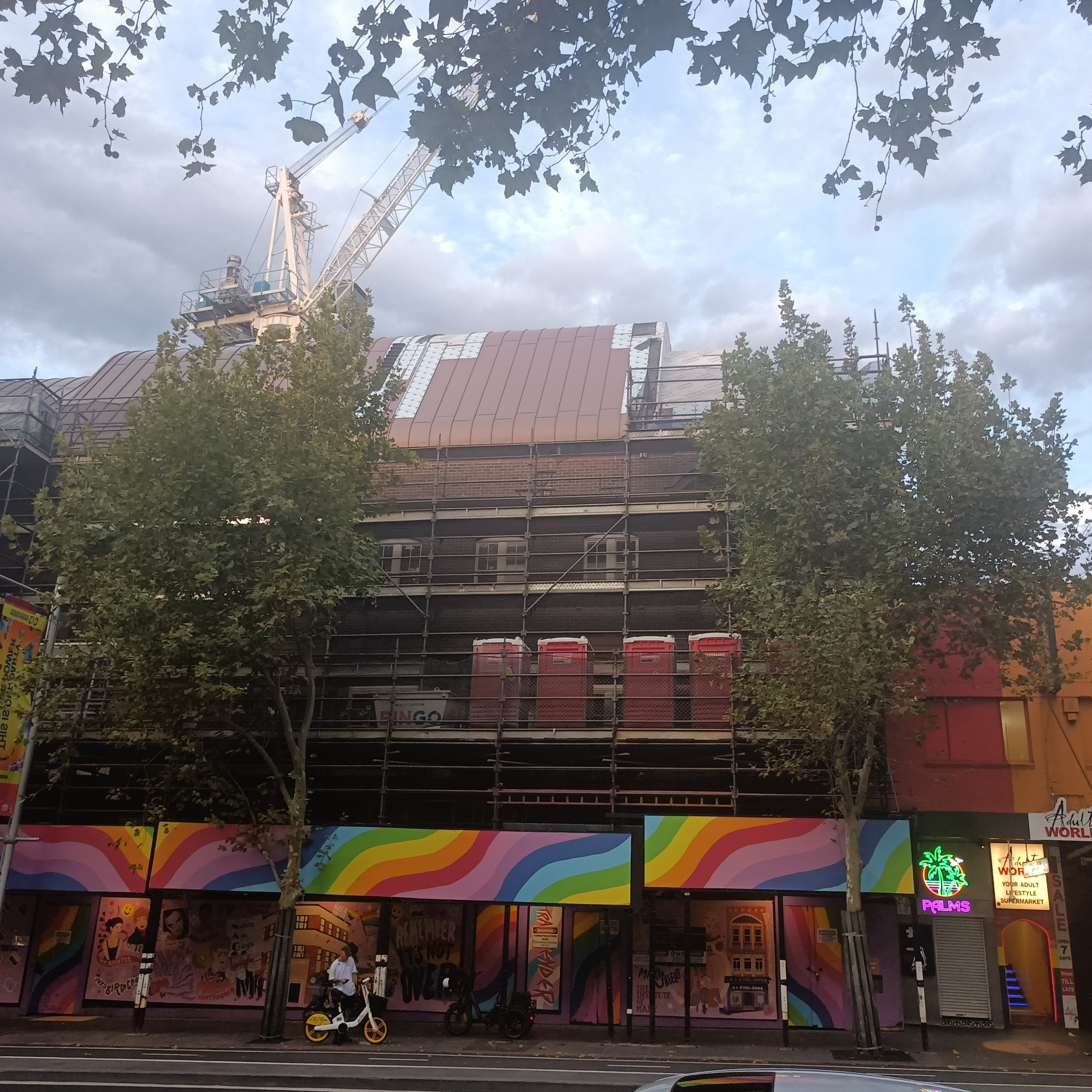
Construction hoardings along Oxford street installed in December 2022 in time for World Pride 2023 that was held in Sydney. The hoardings ran down the Darlinghurst section of Oxford street alongside the parade route of the Sydney Gay and Lesbian Mardi Gras parade and remained in place until around September 2025 when two thirds of them were removed. 2026

During the Vietnam War, the Darlinghurst Road precinct, known as Kings Cross, became a popular destination for US military personnel on R&R – due chiefly to its proximity to a major naval facility. Partially as a result of this, the area gained a reputation as Australia's drugs and prostitution capital and also as one of the very early gay areas. Dozens of hotels constructed at the time ensured that "The Cross" remained a gay ghetto well into the 1990s.

In the years following the World War II, gay men started congregating in bars in Oxford Street, Darlinghurst and by 1969 gay bars such as Ivy's Birdcage and Capriccio's had opened. Queer life developed along the Oxford Street strip, which became known as The Golden Mile.

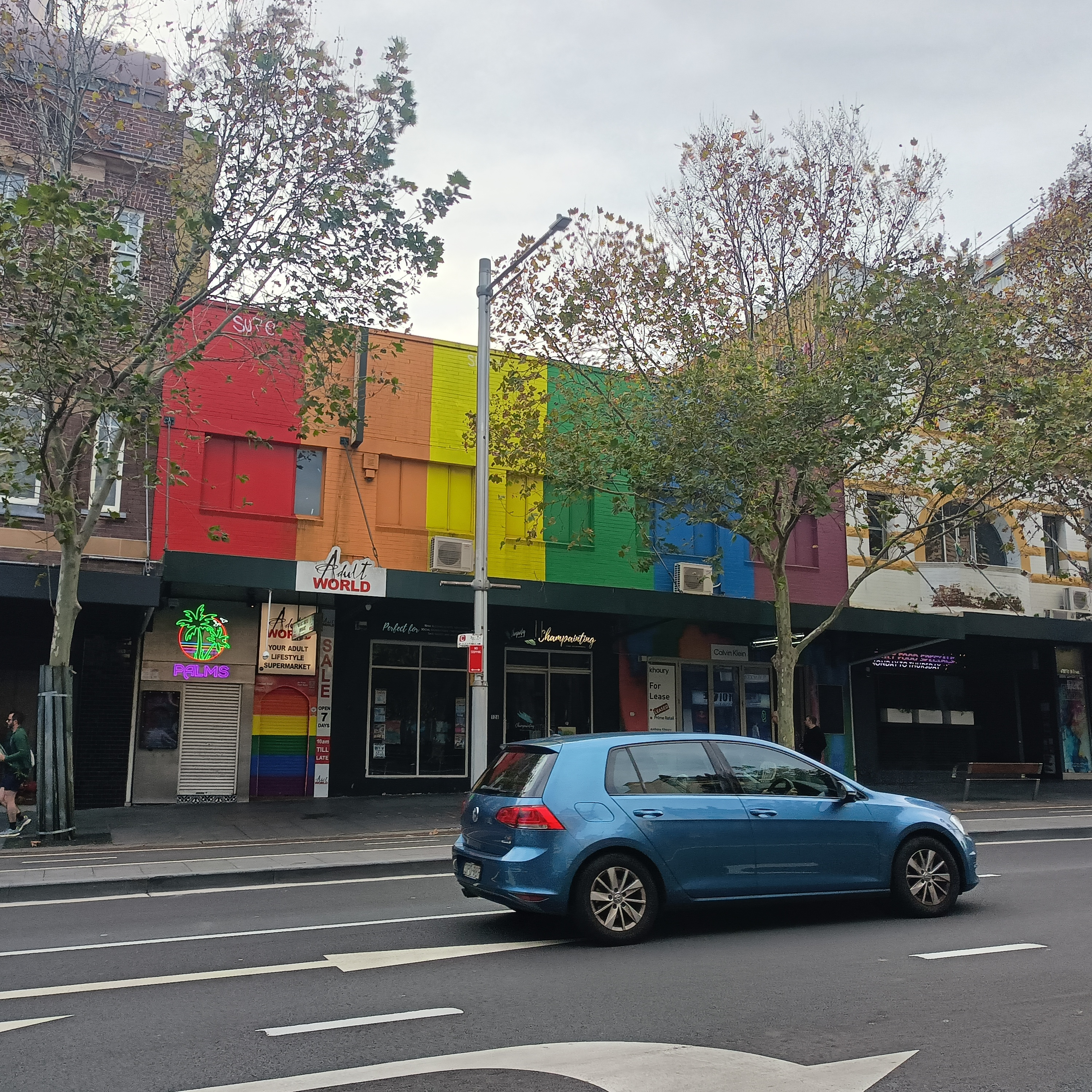
A rainbow flag on the exterior façade and doorway of a sex shop in Darlinghurst, Sydney. 2026

=== Rainbow crossing ===
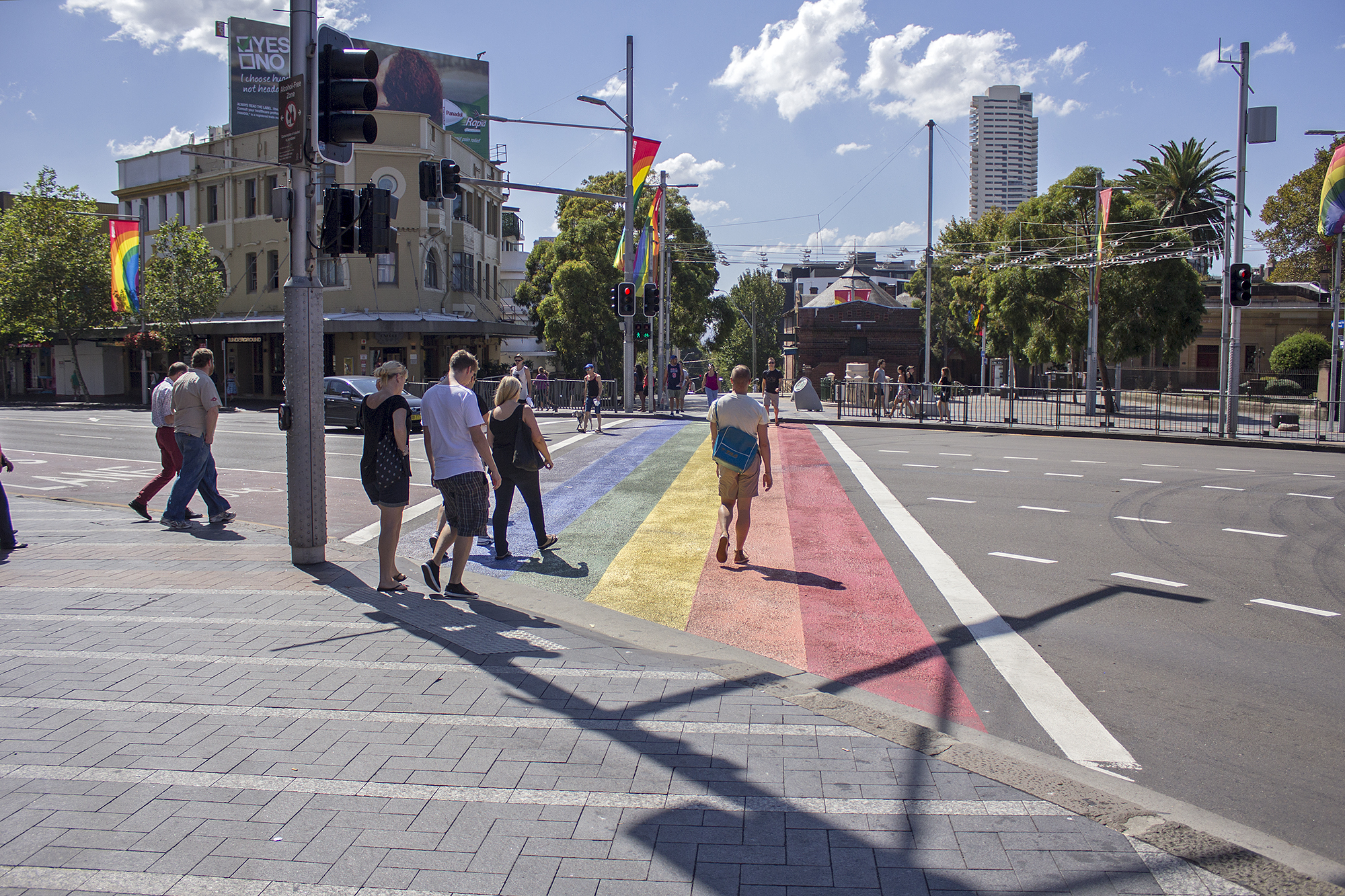

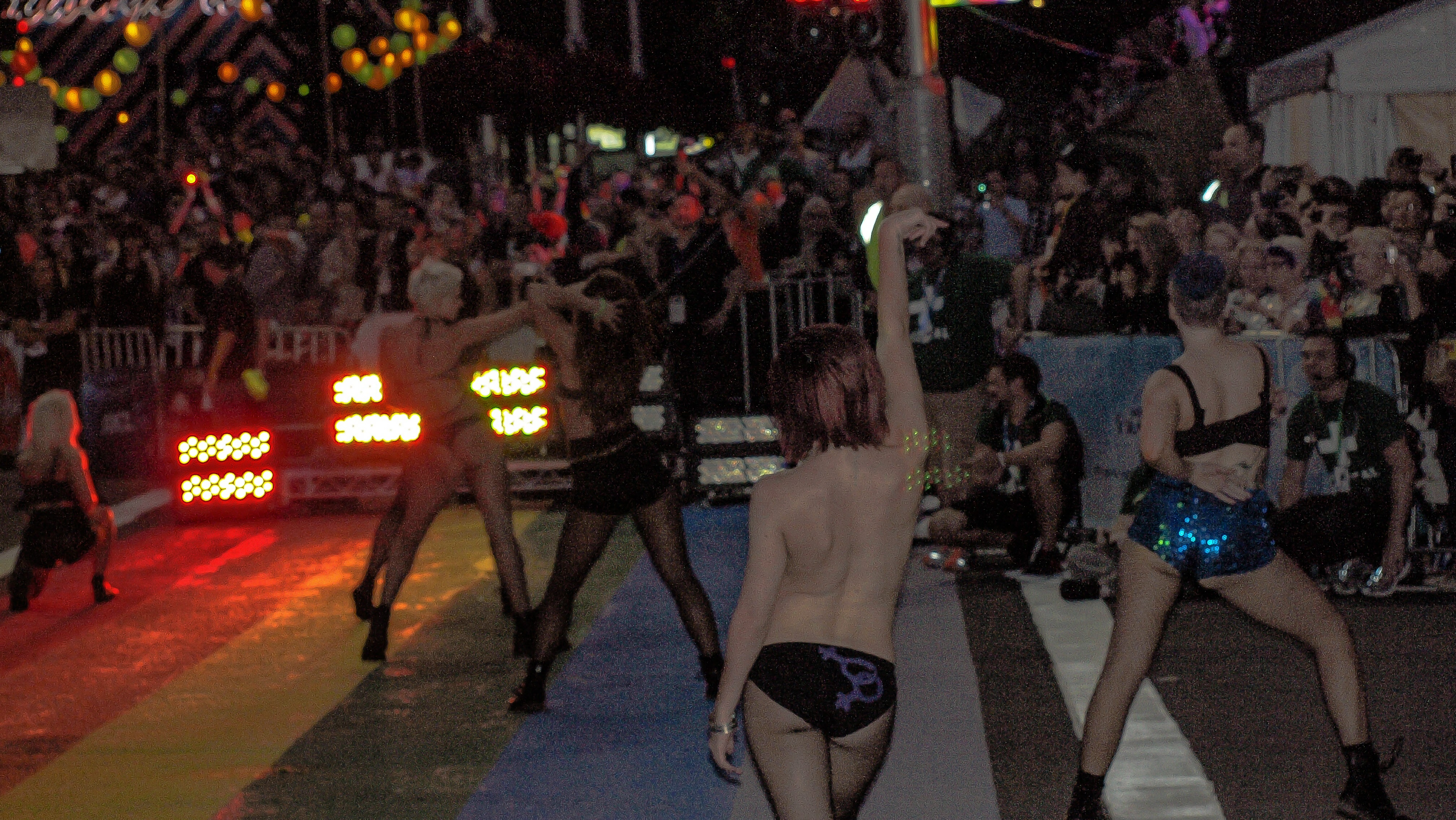
The first temporary rainbow crossing in Australia located between the southern and northern ends of Taylor Square on Oxford Street. It was first installed in February 2013 for the 35th Sydney Gay and Lesbian Mardi Gras and then removed in April 2013.

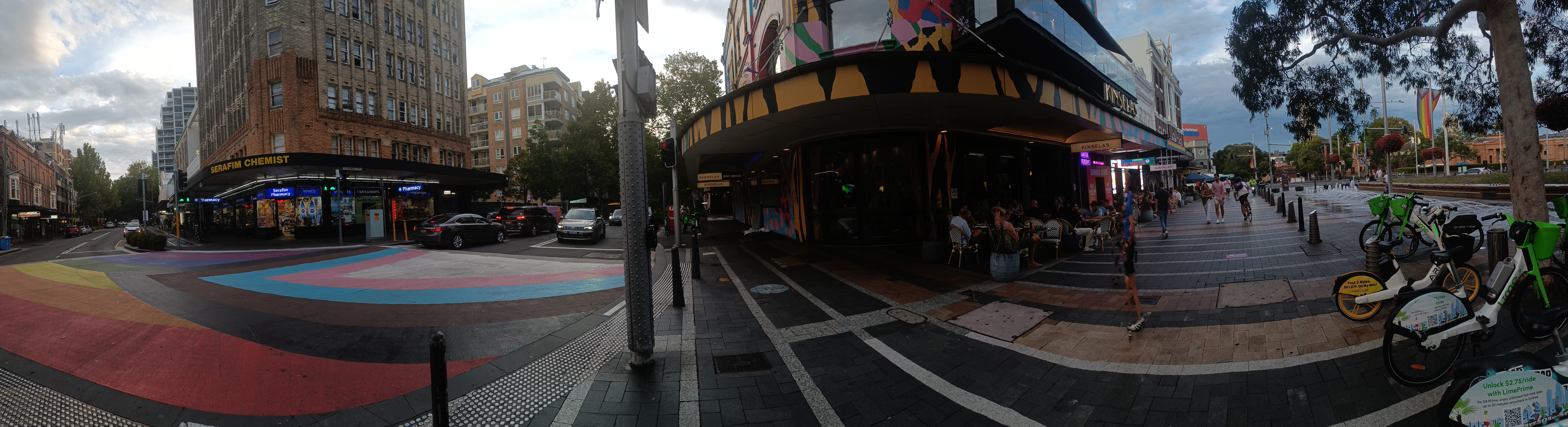
A new rainbow crossing was installed in 2019, and was updated in 2024 to include the progress pride flag. The crossing sits adjacent to the southern end of Taylor Square, on the corner of Campbell and Bourke streets, on the border between Surry Hills and Darlinghurst.

In February 2013 a temporary rainbow crossing was installed between the southern and northern ends of Taylor Square on Oxford st by City of Sydney Council as part of Mardi Gras's 35th anniversary celebrations. The crossing was inspired by two rainbow crossings that were created in time for the 2012 LA Pride Parade and were located alongside the LA Pride Parade route on Santa Monica Boulevard, West Hollywood.

In April 2013 the crossing was removed as part of a condition with Roads & Maritime Services when the rainbow crossing was built. The crossing had been popular with tourists and local residents and soon after it was removed the DIY rainbow crossings movement emerged and was picked up on by the local and international media.

In 2019 a new permanent rainbow crossing was installed at the southern end of Taylor Square and this was updated in 2024 to include the progress pride flag. In 2025 a second permanent rainbow crossing with the progress pride flag was installed at the northern end of Taylor Square.

== Demographics ==
In 2014, over half a million people, or 3.0% of the adult Australian population, identified as gay, lesbian or "other". This included 268,000 people who identified as gay or lesbian and 255,000 people who identified as having an "other" sexual orientation. While New South Wales had just under a third of Australia's population, from the 2011 census, the state had 41% of Australia's male same-sex couples with the top ten suburbs for gay couples all in inner Sydney, including Darlinghurst, Potts Point, Kings Cross, Surry Hills, Alexandria, Lane Cove and Newtown.

In 2019, there were approximately 28,918 people living with HIV across Australia, and NSW is home to approximately 11,721 people living with HIV.

== Events ==
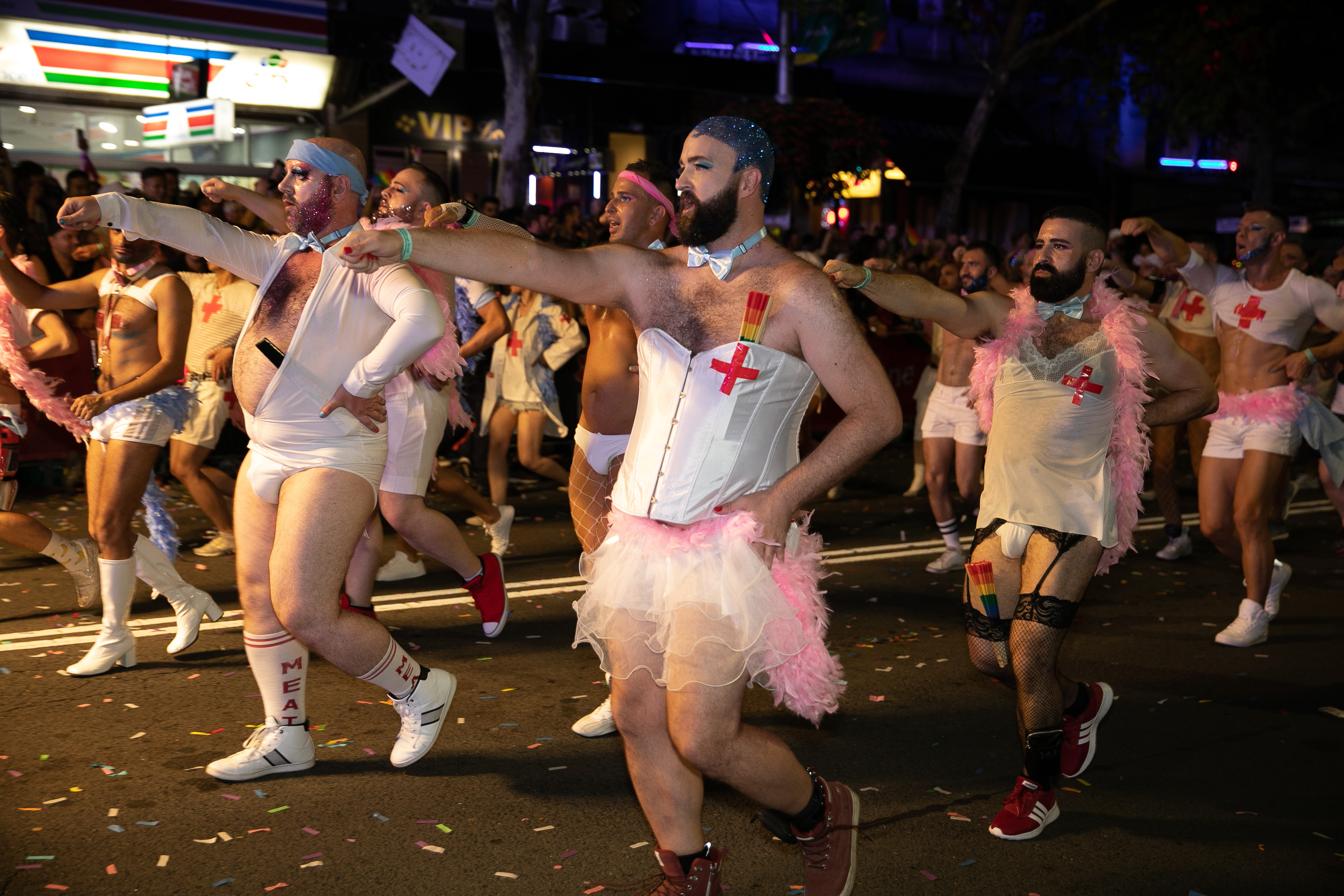
Participants at the 2020 Sydney Gay and Lesbian Mardi Gras. The Sydney Mardi Gras is one of the largest festivals of its kind in the world.

=== Sydney Gay and Lesbian Mardi Gras ===
The Sydney Gay and Lesbian Mardi Gras festival in Sydney, is attended by hundreds of thousands of people from around Australia and overseas. One of the largest such festivals in the world, Mardi Gras is the largest Pride event in Oceania. (Note: As of June 2019, New York City's NYC Pride March is North America’s biggest Pride parade. For Stonewall 50 – WorldPride NYC 2019 up to five million took part over the final weekend, with an estimated four million in attendance at the parade. São Paulo, Brazil's event, Parada do Orgulho GLBT de São Paulo, is South America’s largest, and is listed by Guinness World Records as the world’s largest Pride parade starting in 2006 with 2.5 million people. They broke the Guinness record in 2009 with four million attendees. They have kept the title from 2006 to at least 2016. They had five million attend in 2017. As of 2019 it has three to five million each year. As of June 2019, Spain‘s Madrid Pride, Orgullo Gay de Madrid (MADO), is Europe’s biggest, it had 3.5 million attendees when it hosted WorldPride in 2017. As of June 2019 the largest LGBTQ events include: in Asia it is Taiwan Pride in China’s Taipei; in the Middle East it is Tel Aviv Pride in Israel; in Oceania, it is Australia’s Sydney Mardi Gras Parade; in Africa it is South Africa’s Johannesburg Pride.) It includes a variety of events such as the Sydney Mardi Gras Parade and Party, Bondi Beach Drag Races, Harbour Party, the academic discussion panel Queer Thinking, Mardi Gras Film Festival, as well as Fair Day, which attracts 70,000 people to Victoria Park, Sydney.

The Sydney Mardi Gras and the Mardi Gras parade are one of Australia's biggest tourist drawcards, with the parade and dance party attracting many international and domestic tourists. It is New South Wales' second-largest annual event in terms of economic impact, generating an annual income of about A$30 million for the state.

=== WorldPride Sydney 2023 ===
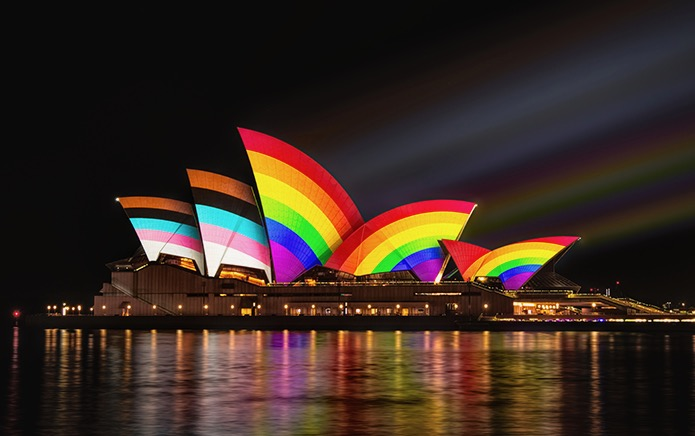
The Sydney Opera House was lit up with the Progress Pride flag colours for WorldPride in 2023.

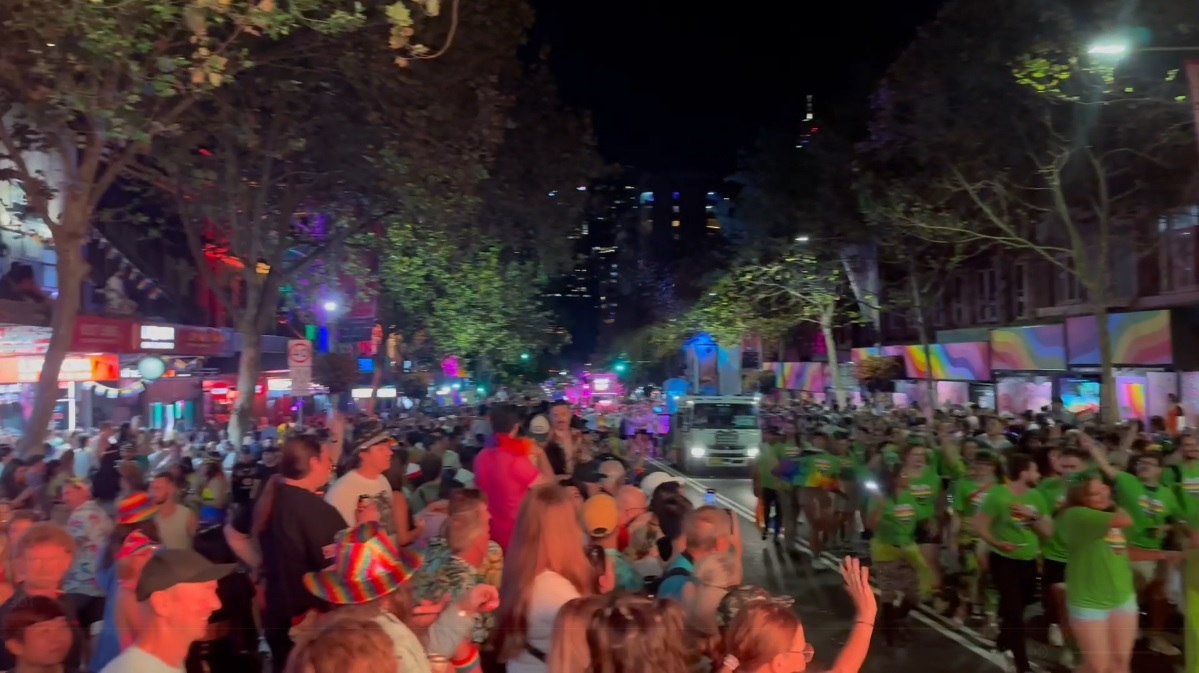
Over 250,000 people watched the Sydney Gay and Lesbian Mardi Gras parade along Oxford st, in Darlinghurst during Sydney WorldPride in 2023. and since the mid-90s around 200,000 to 250,000 people watch the parade each year.

In 2023, Sydney hosted WorldPride, attracting over 310,000 people to the 17-day Mardi Gras festival that is held in conjunction with the parade every year. Events that were included during the 17 days of the 2023 festival were large scale events such as the WorldPride opening ceremony in the Domain, Fair Day, the Mardi Gras after party and Bondi Beach party. Of those 310,000 people, 103,800 were visitors to Sydney and 21,000 people were international visitors. Celebrated gay icons performed musical acts during the fesvtival, including Kylie Minogue, Charli XCX, Kim Petras, Kelly Rowland, Ava Max, Nicole Scherzinger and Jessica Mauboy.

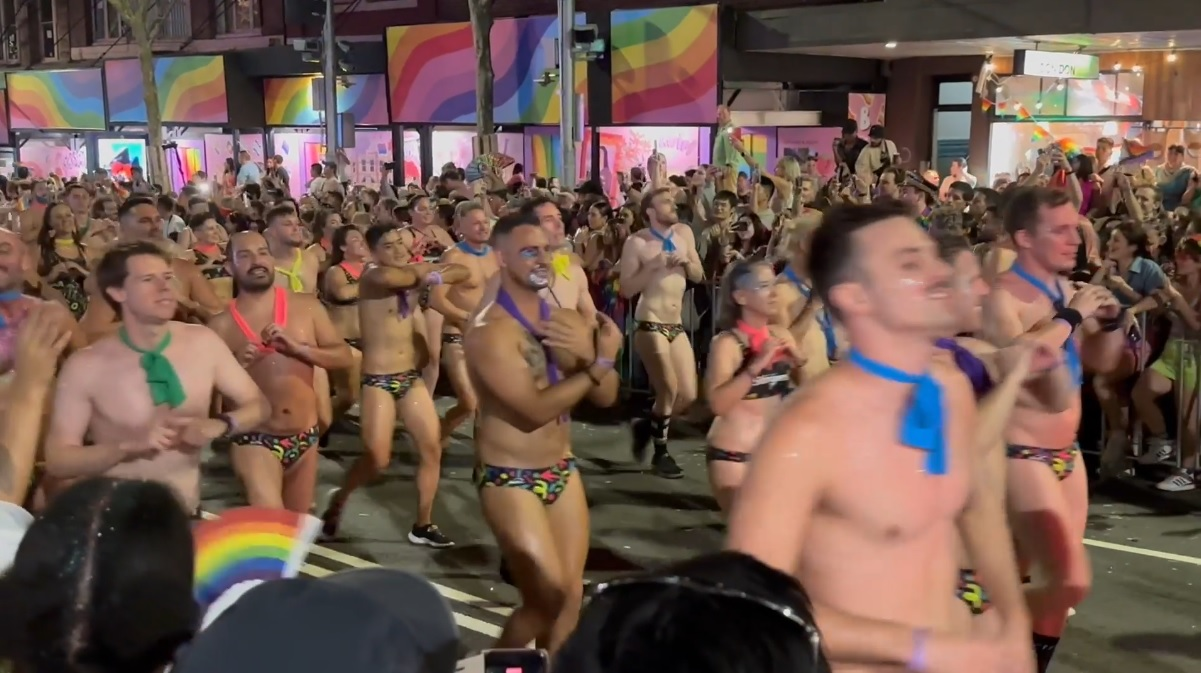
Around 10,000 to 12,000 people participate in the Mardi Gras parade each year. 2023.

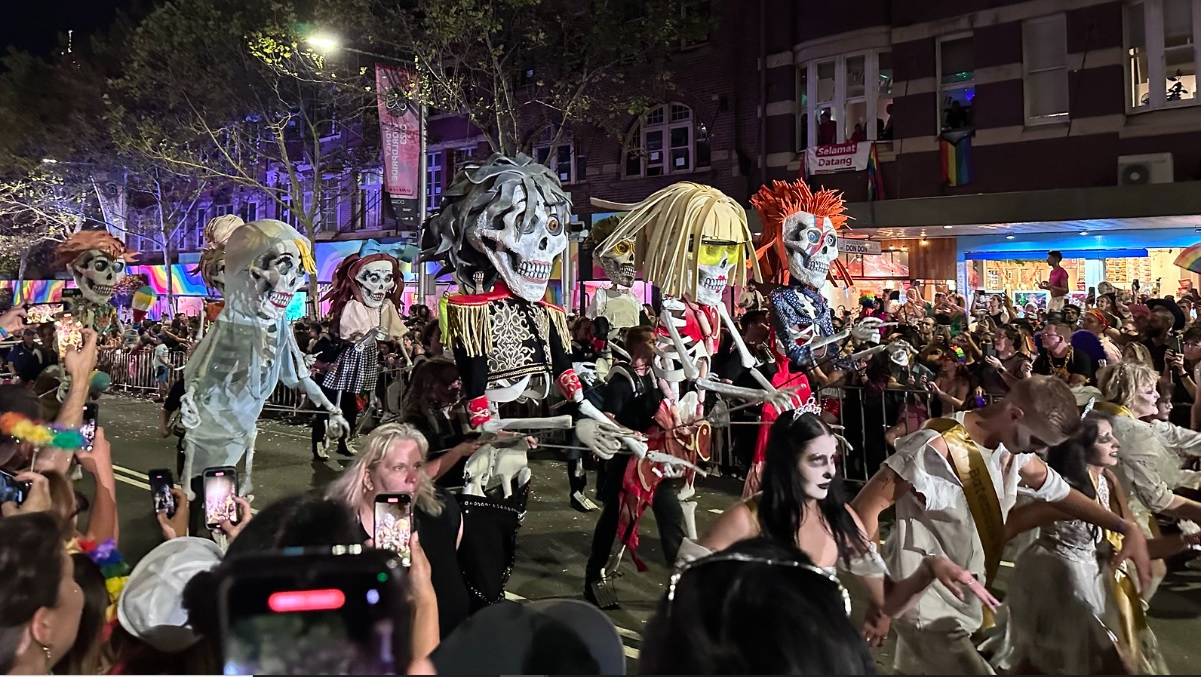
A float in the 2023 Mardi Gras parade. The skeleton on the right references the fictional character Ziggy Stardust that David Bowie would perform as in his concerts during his glam rock era from 1972 – 1974.

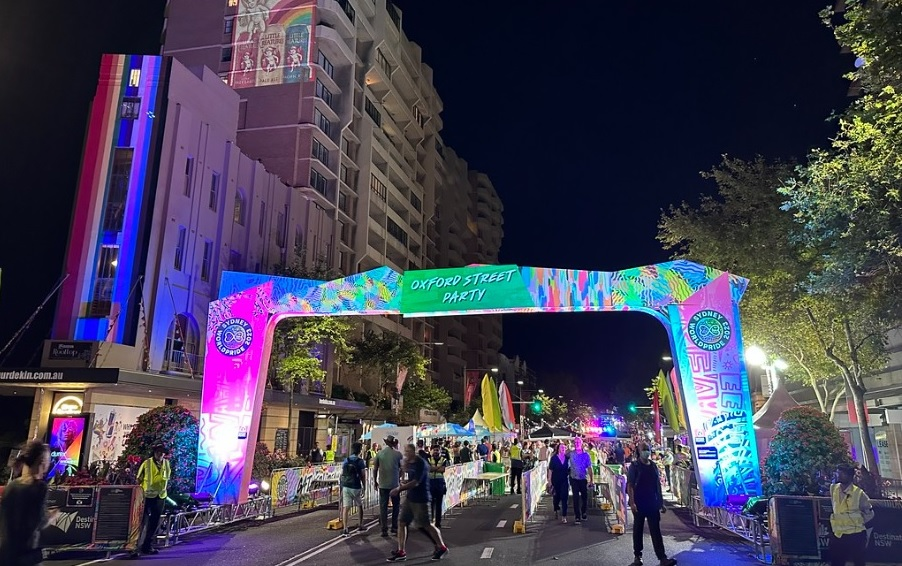
Entrance to the Oxford st party, held on Oxford st in Darlinghurst during Sydney WorldPride in 2023.

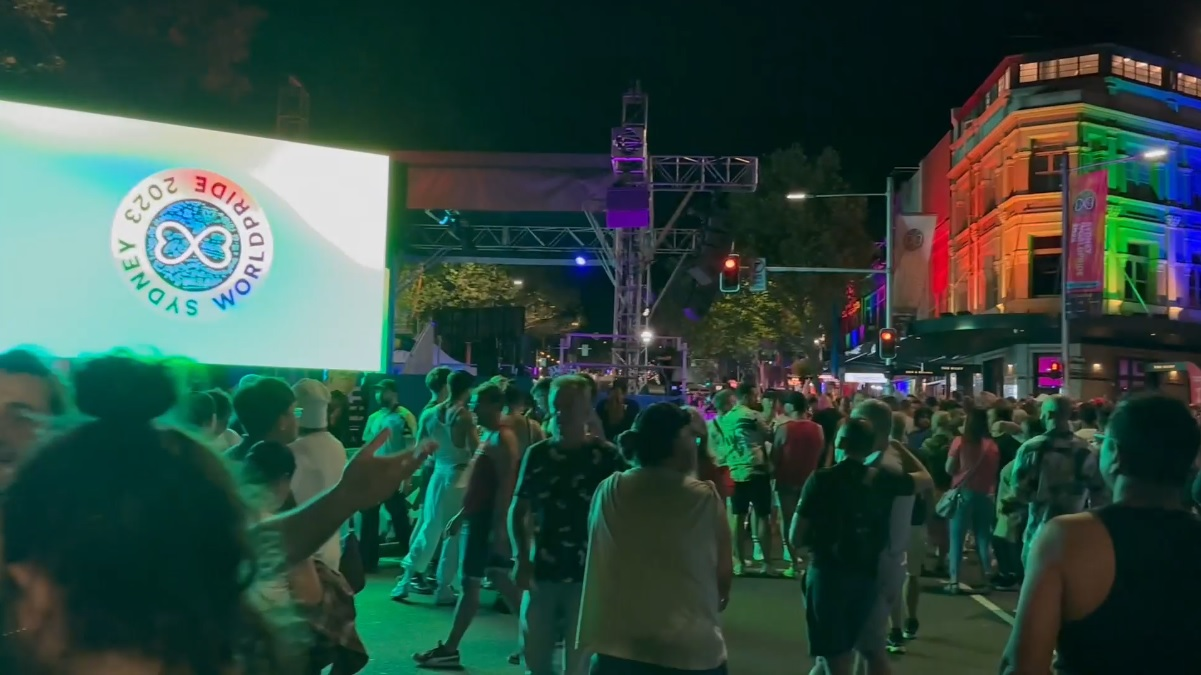
Crowds during the Oxford st party. 2023

== Qtopia ==
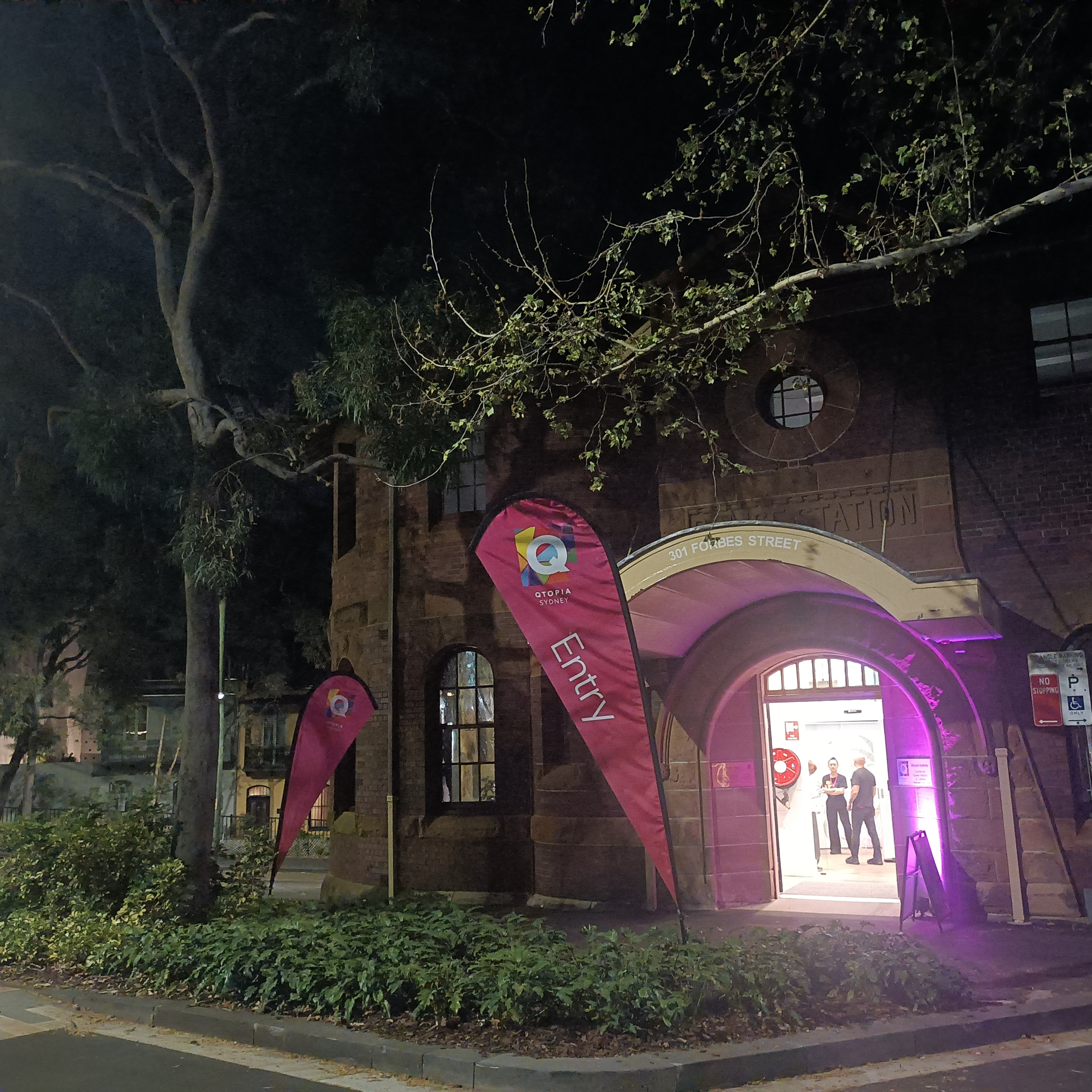
Entrance to the main building of Qtopia adjacent to Taylor square in Darlinghurst, Sydney. Qtopia celebrates queer stories in Sydney. 2026

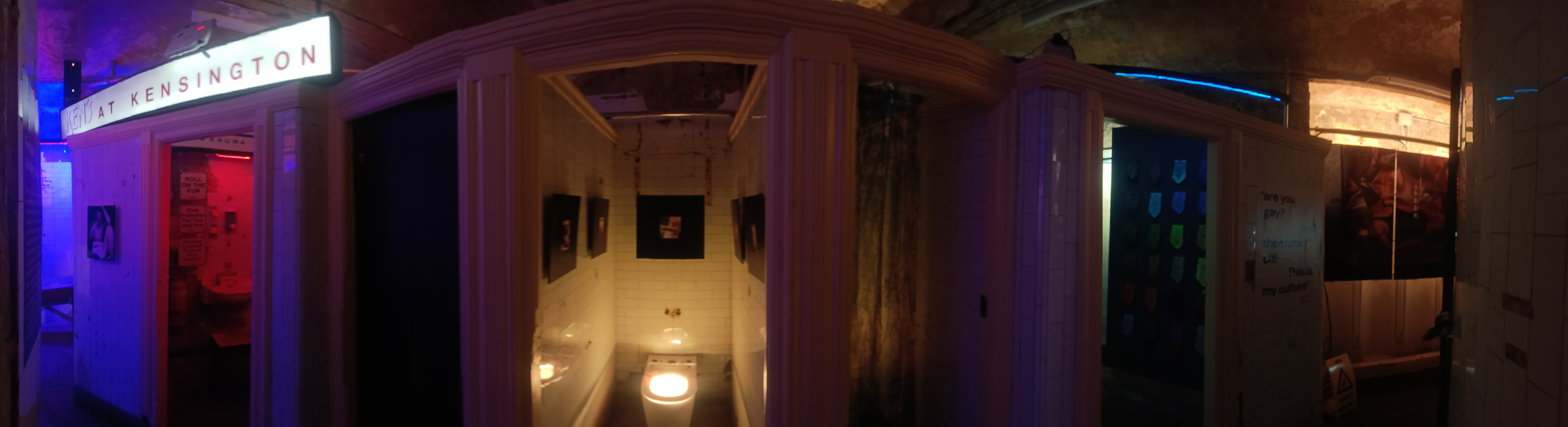
Inside of the underground toilet block exhibition detailing Sydney's gay beat, sauna and cruising culture of the 80's and 90's. The underground male toilets were opened in 1907 in Taylor Square, Darlinghurst, and then closed in 1998 and are now a part of Qtopia Sydney an LGBTQIA+ Museum in Darlinghurst. 2026

In February 2024, a new museum, titled Qtopia, opened in Darlinghurst, Sydney, celebrating queer stories with an extensive collection of objects related to queer culture in Sydney. It sits across three main sites which include the main building at 301 Forbes St., Darlinghurst, the substation and the underground toilet block, both of which are located at the northern end of Taylor Square.

It initially began as a temporary exhibition held during Sydney World Pride in 2023 and was located in the bandstand pavilion in Green Park, Darlinghurst, as well as at the National Art School that sits adjacent to Green Park in Darlinghurst.

The underground toilet block was opened to the public in 1907 and then closed in 1998 and it now hosts "exhibitions exploring Sydney's gay beat, sauna and cruising culture of the 1980s and 90s." and it was itself the location of a popular beat in Sydney for decades until it closed in 1998.

The substations 40-seat theatre hosts performances including music, drag, comedy, cabaret and poetry all year round with numerous performances being held in conjunction with the Sydney Gay and Lesbian Mardi Gras in February and March each year as well as during Pride month in June of each year.

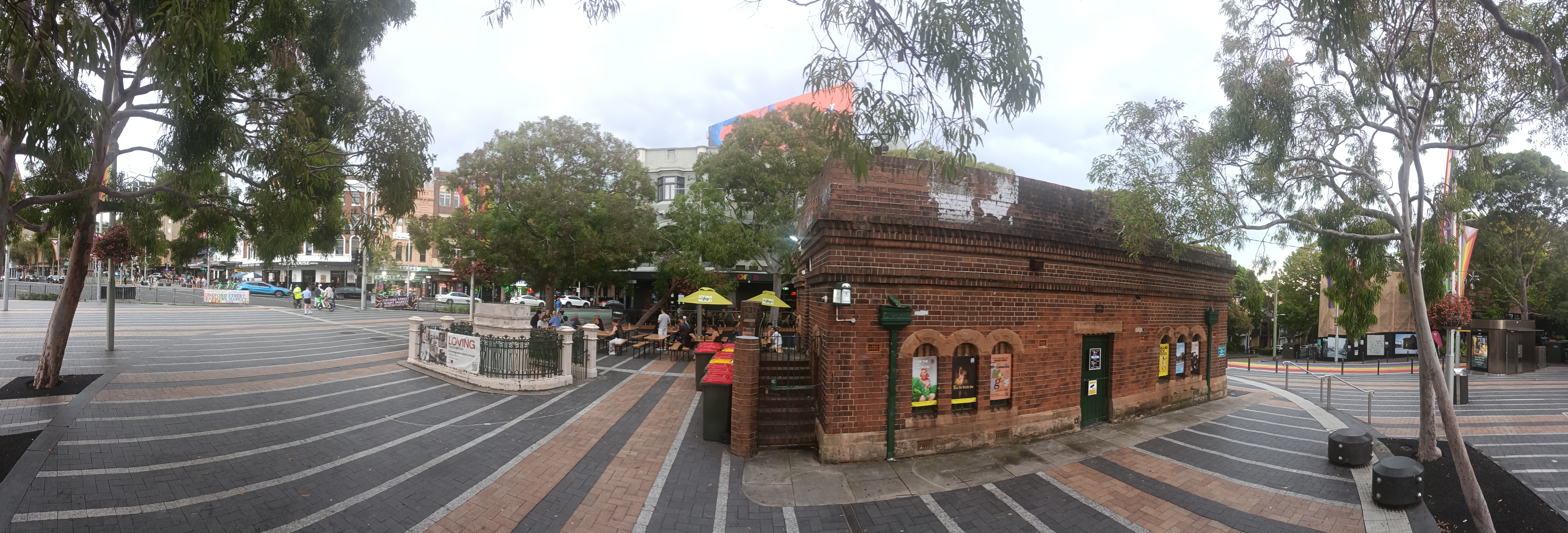
The substation and underground toilet block located at the northern end of Taylor Square.

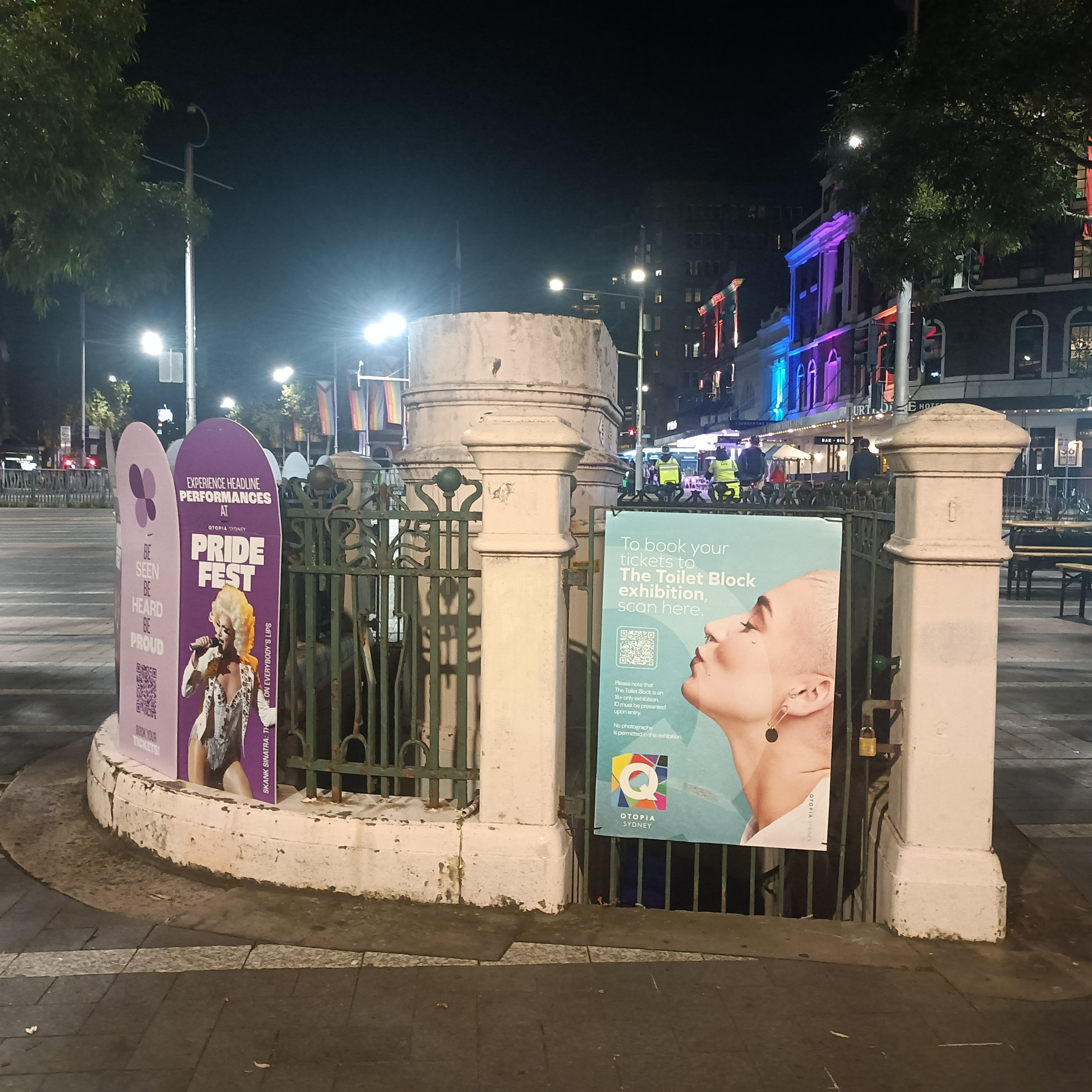
The underground toilet block is used by Qtopia to host exhibitions. 2025

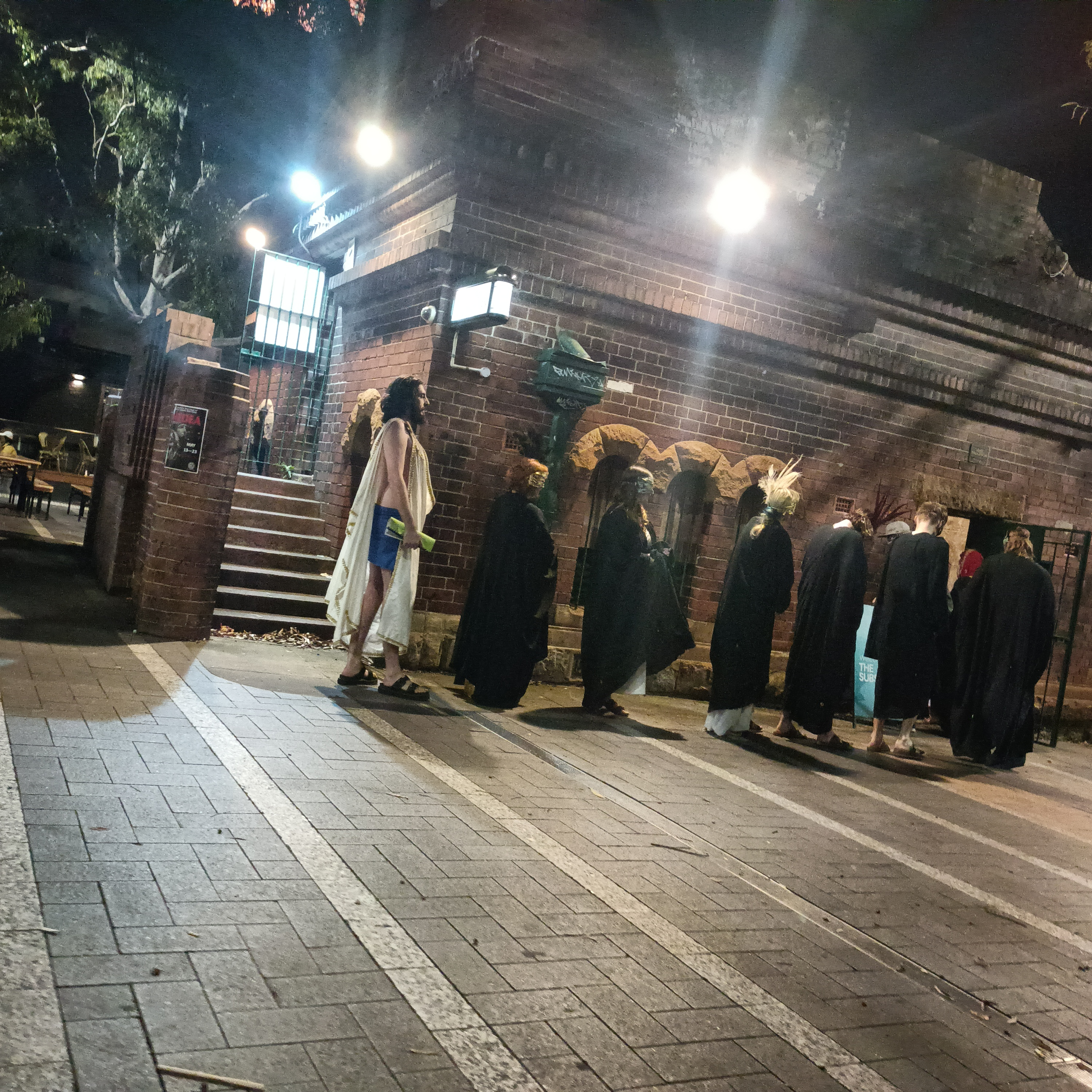
Performers in costumes entering the substation. 2026

== See also ==
- Sydney Gay and Lesbian Mardi Gras
- LGBT rights in Australia
- List of LGBT events
- Mardi Gras Film Festival
- Rainbow crossing
- Tourism in Sydney
- Culture of Sydney
- Ron Austin (one of the founders)
- Lance Gowland (one of the founders)

== See also ==
- LGBT rights in Australia
- Australian Marriage Law Postal Survey
