= Ruby Reds =

Former LGBT bar in Sydney, Australia

Ruby Reds was an LGBT bar located at 273 Crown Street, Surry Hills in Sydney, Australia. Started by entrepreneur Dawn O'Donnell, it is considered Sydney's first lesbian bar.

== History ==
The site had been a disused steakhouse ("Ruby Reds Steakhouse") acquired by Dawn O’Donnell and her business partner, Roger-Claude Tesseydre. In September 1978 a development application understood to be associated with Ruby Reds was lodged by Australian Tavernas to maintain the restaurant on-site and allow recorded music and dancing.

In a 1995 article in Lesbians on the Loose, O'Donnell is described as persuading Roger Claude Tesseydre to invest in a lesbian club, with Ruby Reds the result.

=== Opening ===
The opening date for Ruby Reds is variously attributed as 1975, 1976 and 1979. Frances Rand, co-founder and publisher of Lesbians on the Loose, dates it to around 1975, which aligns with documentation held by the City of Sydney Council.

=== Notable events ===
The Daily Mirror reported on a riot that occurred at Ruby Reds on New Year's Eve in 1979. Altercations apparently occurred between police and lesbian patrons from Melbourne.

=== Closing and subsequent iterations ===
A Lesbians on the Loose article suggested that the venue's decline and subsequent closure was due in part to a new manager's strictly enforced dress code, around 1992.

It is not clear when Ruby Reds closed, with sources variously claiming the year to be 1982 or 1986. It was reopened under the new name "Rubies." before closing again in the last quarter of 1992 or early 1993.

After the first closure of Ruby Reds, the building housed a succession of other LGBTQ+ venues. These were:

- Querelle (mixed venue), which opened on 23 May 1986
- the Boogie Room, opened by building owner Roger Carroll n November 1988.
- ‘B’s opened in early 1990
- Pastels a few months after 'B's.
- Ruby Red’s reopened in the venue in 1991 as “Rubies.”, closed in the last quarter of 1992 or early 1993.
- Headquarters, a gay male bath house and bar opened in 1995.
- Trade cruise club opened December 2016, closing in 2023.

== Potential heritage-listing ==
Following the successful heritage-listing of several LGBTQ+ venues in Sydney in 2025, City of Sydney Council proposed heritage-listing the former Ruby Reds along with two other sites. The proposal is ongoing.

== Attributes of venue ==
Descriptions from patrons describe a venue with stairs, a longroom, lit up dance floor, and exposed bricks. It had a dance floor between two bars

Pride History Group retains recorded oral histories about Ruby Reds, and describe the bar as follows:

"They [O'Donnell and Tesseydre] took out the tables and chairs and turned the kitchen into a bar, but left the leather banquettes for people to sit on. It was a long, narrow building with a dance floor in the middle and seating around the edge."

The venue has retroactively been described as welcoming to all LGBTQ+ people, however first-hand accounts suggest it was a predominately lesbian or "woman-only" space.

== Contemporary accounts ==
Dawn O'Donnell, co-owner, met her partner at the bar on either March 31 or April 1 in 1977. She reflected on Ruby Reds in a 1995 interview:

"From day one, it was the right place at the right time...Ruby's was an era, and I think I arranged a few marriages there in my time".

Colette Par referred to Ruby Reds in an interview with Pride History as "Pubic Dreds" because it was "a pick-up joint". Chris Pearce and others referred to it as "Rubies". Roni McCarrigle recalled:

"[Ruby Reds was] fun if you could get past the bouncer, very small place, every lesbian in Sydney went to it, always packed, played the music of the day, always met up with someone that you knew...The bouncer at Ruby Reds would throw people down the stairs."

Sue-Ellen Rosenberg, interviewed in 2007, would attend on Friday and Saturday nights, when they played "slow music, not for dancing". She described a "pick up area" near the dance floor, and recalls fights and disputes taking place in the bar. She described a range of patrons as "nice dykes", "scary dykes", or "heavies". In Lesbians on the Loose, Ruby Reds was described as follows:

"The back bar was the rough end for butchs [sic] and diesels and the cocktail bar was for lipstick lesbians and if you were available, there was the notorious pickup wall."

== Homage ==
In 2017, Amanda Honey hosted a quarterly night at Petersham Town Hall called Red Raw, "to honour the golden days of Sydney’s gay scene", and "revive" Ruby Reds

== Notable patrons ==
Dawn O'Donnell, entrepreneur and co-owner also frequented the venue.

Soula, lover of Dusty Springfield, was a bouncer.

Trish Anthony, "Sydney's first dyke DJ", performed at Ruby Reds.

== See also ==
- List of lesbian bars
- List of LGBTQ bars
- LGBT culture in Sydney
