= Capriccio's =

Gay club and theatre in Sydney, Australia

Capriccio's was a popular gay bar and theatre once situated near Taylor Square on Oxford Street in the city of Sydney, Australia. Opened by Dawn O'Donnell and Marjorie Hathaway in 1969, the venue was one of the first two establishments on what became known as Sydney's gay "Golden Mile", the other being Ivy's Birdcage.

== Capriccio's in the 1970s ==
The venue was known for its drag performances. As described by photographer William Yang,

"the most popular place was Capriccio's in Oxford Street. There were two floors, a bar on the first and a theatre with tables and chairs and a stage upstairs. It was always busy. They did extravagant shows: big casts, gorgeous costumes and handsome men to accompany the queens."

In a 1990s interview, Dawn O'Donnell explained that due to difficulties purchasing property as a woman at the time, Sydney's emerging gay scene was established from what property was affordable: run-down shops and brothels in the less fashionable parts of town.

"We actually changed the face of east Sydney...and turned that rather un-chic area into what it is today".

== Final Show ==
Before closing, Capriccio's held a final drag show, Roseland Ballroom, which lured large crowds and had a production cost rumoured to exceed $30,000 (AUD).

== 'Queen of Clubs: From Leather to Feather' ==
In 2008, a video of Roseland Ballroom was uploaded to MySpace by an Adelaide drag queen, which inspired the production of a homage to Sydney's drag scene in the 1970s, Queen Of Clubs: From Leather To Feather.

Amelia Airhead, one of the drag queens who created the show, said that

"The second part is an exploration of [Capriccio's] but has a modern day twist. Everything is about yellow and sparkle...this symbolises the amazing era of the 70s. Many of the outfits are kept to the original way...Drag shows have changed, especially as Capriccios was a seven-nights-a-week venue that had the ultimate professionalism with sets flying in and out, today we perform in pubs behind the bar or on a little stage. Not that it's a bad thing – the economy has changed. Drag queens have had to become cleverer and innovate. The video clip tells how drag has changed."

== See also ==
- List of LGBTQ bars
- LGBTQ culture in Sydney
