= 78ers =

Group of LGBTQ activists

The 78ers are a group of LGBTQ activists who marched in the original Sydney Mardi Gras on 24 June 1978 and participated in the subsequent protests against police violence and the arrests of participants in the Mardi Gras. In 1997 a small group of people who were part of the 1978 events contributed to planning the commemoration of the 20th anniversary of the Sydney Mardi Gras parade in 1998. This group became known as the 78ers and has led each year's Mardi Gras parade since 1998.

== History ==
The first Sydney Mardi Gras was an evening street protest in support of gay and lesbian rights along Oxford Street in Sydney on 24 June 1978. The protestors were assaulted and thrown in jail, with many affected by the trauma for years afterwards. The 78ers were amongst those who participated in the Mardi Gras and the protest at Darlinghurst and Central Police Stations on 25 June 1978, the protest at Central Court Sydney on 26 June 1978 where 300 protested outside the closed court in Liverpool Street and seven were arrested, the gay rights march from Martin Place to Darlinghurst Police Station on 15 July 1978 where 2,000 protested and 14 were arrested and the March down Oxford Street from the 4th National Homosexual Conference to Taylor Square and Hyde Park on 27 August 1978 with 300 participants and 104 arrests. Most of the charges against those arrested were eventually dropped and the New South Wales Summary Offences Act, which had given Police very wide powers to arrest people, was repealed in May 1979.

In the days following the Sydney Morning Herald published the names, occupations and addresses of people facing charges.

In 1997 a small group of people who were part of the 1978 events contributed to planning the commemoration of the 20th anniversary of the Sydney Mardi Gras parade in 1998. This group became known as the 78ers and has led each year's Mardi Gras parade since 1998.

== Members ==
The 78ers included activists Garry Wotherspoon, Kate Rowe, Jacqueline Hyde, Peter Murphy, Julie McCrossin, Peter de Waal, Peter “Bon” Bonsall-Boone, Robyn Plaister, Robyn Kennedy, Ron Austin, Diane Minnis, Lance Day, Lance Gowland, Bobby Goldsmith, and many others.

== Legacy ==
On 25 February 2016 the New South Wales State Parliament made a formal bipartisan apology to the 78ers when Bruce Notley Smith, the member for Coogee, moved the motion of apology in the NSW Legislative Assembly.

On 24 February 2016 The Sydney Morning Herald published an apology to the 78ers, Darren Goodsir, editor-in-chief said "In 1978, The Sydney Morning Herald reported the names, addresses and professions of people arrested during public protests to advance gay rights. The paper at the time was following the custom and practice of the day. We acknowledge and apologise for the hurt and suffering that reporting caused. It would never happen today."

On 9 August 2018 NSW Police Commissioner Michael Fuller gave an official apology on behalf of the Police Force for the actions of police during the events of 1978.

== In popular culture ==
- Witches and Faggots, Dykes and Poofters produced by Digby Duncan, 1980. A contemporary history of the events surrounding the first march by the 78ers.
- Riot directed by Jeffrey Walker, 2018 A telemovie released for the 40th Anniversary of Sydney's Gay and Lesbian Mardi Gras.
