= Zoë Coombs Marr =

Australian comedian

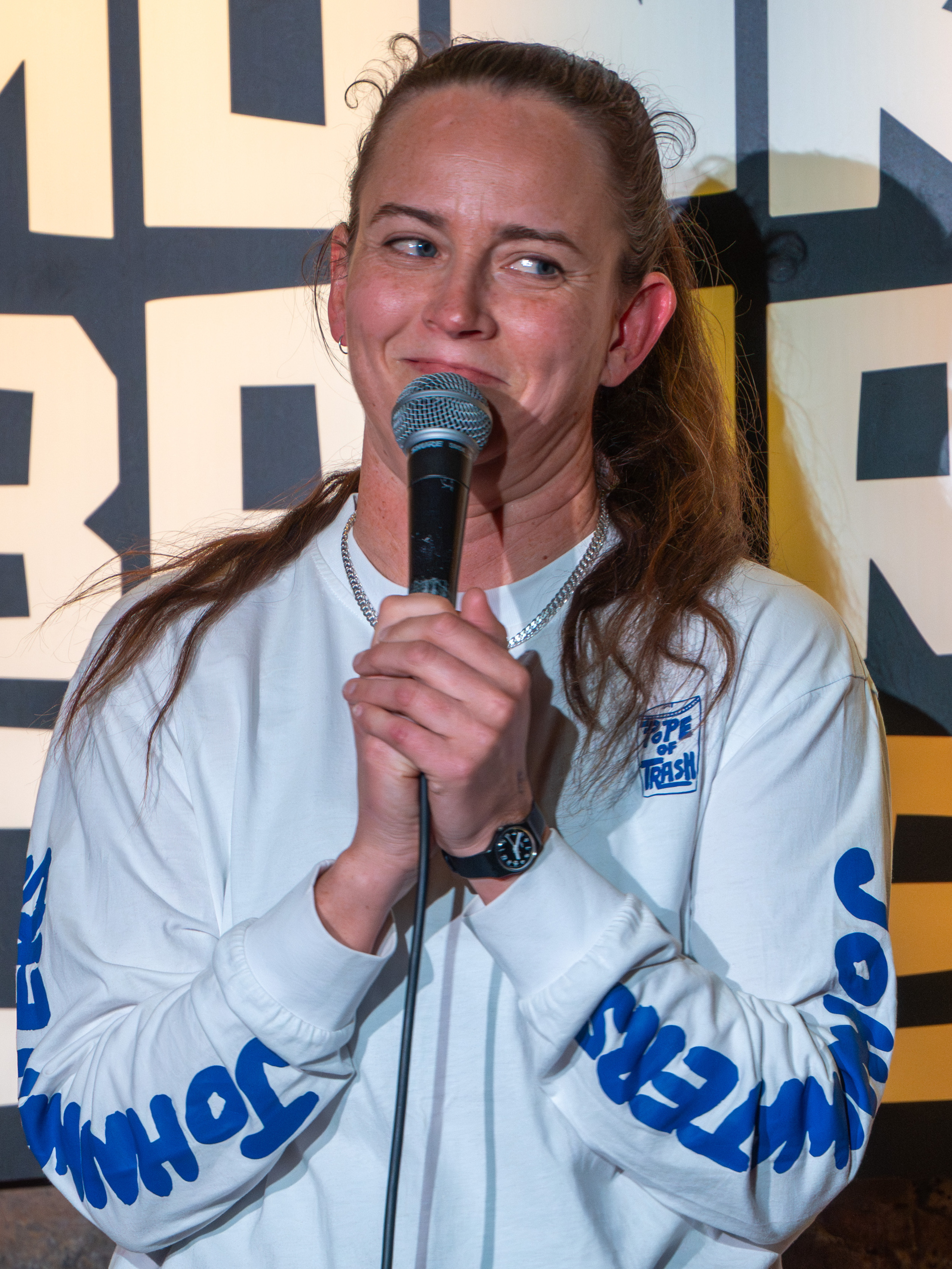
- Coombs Marr in 2025
- Born: 1984 or 1985 (age 41–42)
- Occupations: Comedian; actor
- Notable work: Trigger Warning (2016)
- Awards: Melbourne International Comedy Festival Award (2016)

Zoë Coombs Marr (born 1984/1985) is an Australian comedian, performer and actor.

In 2014, Coombs Marr acted in Gideon Obarzanek’s L’Chaim which premiered as part of Sydney Dance Company's season Interplay.

In 2016, her show Trigger Warning, in which she adopts the persona of a sexist man called "Dave", received the Barry Award at the Melbourne International Comedy Festival (MICF). As well as the Barry (now known as Melbourne International Comedy Festival Award), the show also won two Green Room Awards.

Coombs Marr introduced her new character, "Bossy Bottom", at the Adelaide Fringe in March 2018, after she decided to leave "Dave" behind. She was nominated for the Helpmann Award for Best Comedy Performer for her new show. In April 2020, Amazon Prime started streaming a comedy special of "Bossy Bottom".

In 2022, Coombs Marr brought back the character of "Dave" who, as revealed in her new show, The Opener, had been in a coma since 2016 and missed a lot of historic events such as the #MeToo movement, and the Black Lives Matter movement.

Coombs Marr's ABC series Queerstralia television series premiered in 2023, taking on a unique approach in presenting queer Australian history. In 2025 she appeared as a contestant on Claire Hooper's House Of Games.
