= Dawn O'Donnell =

Australian entrepreneur

- Born: c.1927 or 1928; Paddington, New South Wales, Australia
- Died: 10 June 2007 (aged 79)
- Occupations: Entrepreneur, activist

Dawn O'Donnell (born 1927 or 1928 – died 10 June 2007), was an Australian entrepreneur and a supporter of Sydney's LGBT community. She has been credited with being a defining early influence on the gay and lesbian nightlife in Sydney's Oxford Street and Newtown.

== Early life ==
Born circa 1927 or 1928 in the Sydney suburb of Paddington, she won a bursary to St Vincent's College, Potts Point, run by the Sisters of Charity. She left school at age 15, and three years later, aged 18, won the Australian ladies speed skating championship, turned professional and taught at the Glaciarium before going to London and Paris. She was briefly married to a butcher named Des Irwin. Her career began as an international ice skater when she was a teenager. It was while touring Paris as a performer in the Puss in Boots on ice show, she had her first romance with another woman.

== Career ==
After her promising skating career was cut short by injury, O'Donnell ran a butcher shop in Double Bay and a parking lot in Ultimo, before opening her first gay bar, The Trolley Bar, off Broadway in 1968. Next she opened a gay bath-house (above a cake shop in Bondi Junction), followed in 1969 by Capriccio's, a gay night club on Oxford Street famous for its drag shows, which drew visiting celebrities from around the world.

She recognised the gay and lesbian potential of Oxford Street. At this time, homosexual acts between men were still illegal in New South Wales, and Dawn O'Donnell was known to pay bail to release gay men from police custody. Her gay and lesbian venues gave many "a place to come out". In 2001, O'Donnell recounted: "The most fascinating thing in the world for me was eventually to see the New South Wales Police Force have a gay public relations officer. I never thought to my dying day I'd ever see that."

Throughout the 1970s and 1980s, O'Donnell controlled a string of lesbian and gay venues in East Sydney, including:

- Jools on Crown Street
- Patchs nightclub on Oxford Street
- Flo's Palace
- The Exchange Hotel
- Ruby Reds on Crown Street (Sydney's first lesbian bar)

Some of these ventures were run in partnership with the late French restaurateur Roger Claude Teyssedre and controversial Sydney businessman Abe Saffron. The clubs attracted gays and lesbians from across Australia and around the world.

During the 1980s, O'Donnell began to shift her focus from Oxford Street to the Inner West suburb of Newtown. She bought the Newtown and Imperial Hotels in nearby Erskineville, transforming the Newtown area into a gay precinct to rival Oxford Street. The Imperial Hotel featured in the opening scenes of the movie, The Adventures of Priscilla, Queen of the Desert.

According to Graeme Browning (a.k.a. "Mitzi Macintosh"), who performed drag shows at O'Donnell-owned venues for 10 years, "she made the Sydney drag scene what it is, but our gay scene wouldn't be what it is without her either." Another drag performer, David Williams (aka "Beatrice") said that "she invented the idea of Oxford Street", helping to make Sydney one of the gay capitals of the world.

== Personal life and death ==
In 1977, aged 49, O'Donnell met her long-term partner, Dutch-born Aniek Baten, who was 26 years old. They later married, both wearing white for the wedding. Their relationship continued until O'Donnell's death from ovarian cancer, aged 79, on 10 June 2007. O'Donnell's funeral service was held at St Canice's Catholic Church in Elizabeth Bay, Sydney.
