= Sue Wills =

Australian academic and activist (1944–2022)

- Born: Susan Elizabeth Wills; 1944; Australia
- Died: 26 August 2022 (aged 77–78); Australia
- Occupations: Academic, activist
- Years active: 1972–2009

Sue Wills (1944 – 26 August 2022) was an Australian activist, prominent in the Women's Liberation Movement and the press for LGBT rights. She was instrumental in challenging the psychiatric community's views and treatment of homosexuality and a co-founder of the Campaign Against Moral Persecution (C.A.M.P.)

== Biography ==
Sue Wills was born in 1944. After graduating from the University of Sydney with a degree in social psychology in 1971, she became an academic.

In 1970, Wills joined with Christabel Poll, John Ware, and Lex Watson to form the Campaign Against Moral Persecution (C.A.M.P.) to develop a platform for revising Australia's laws on homosexuality. C.A.M.P. was particularly focused on having members of the LGBT community participate in the debates over legal change, believing that action by homosexuals could change mainstream misconceptions. Wills served as co-president of C. A. M. P. from 1972 to 1974, along with Watson, and the two were instrumental in challenging the psychiatric community's views on homosexuality. Specifically, they spoke out about the dangers of aversion therapy and the use of surgery to treat mental illness, arguing that homosexuality was not an illness that needed to be "cured".

In 1972, Wills and her partner, Gaby (Gabrielle) Antolovich, appeared in the Australian Broadcasting Corporation's documentary series Chequerboard, in which she made the point that tolerance differs from acceptance. The series focused on five members of the LGBT community and, besides Wills and Antolovich, included Peter Bonsall-Boone and his partner Peter de Waal, aspiring priest Fabian Lo Shiavo and educator Robert Walmsley. The groundbreaking documentary explored same sex relationships, psychiatric treatment as it was practiced at the time; religion and homosexuality; and the process involved in accepting one's sexuality and coming out. In 1973, Wills interviewed a well-known psychiatrist who prescribed aversion therapy, Neil McConaghy. Her ensuing article, "Intellectual Poofter Bashers" was carried in Camp Ink, C.A.M.P.’s newsletter, and distributed to attendants at a psychiatry conference organized by McConaghy in 1973. While the article was not successful in changing the minds of the psychiatric community, it did stop many homosexuals from seeking the help of psychiatrists to change their orientation. She resigned from C.A.M.P. leadership in 1974, as the sexism of some of the men in the organisation drowned out lesbian voices.

When she first encountered the Women's Liberation Movement, Wills was not interested until she realised after reading an article in MeJane that lesbian issues were women's issues. In 1974, as women left gay organizations throughout the world, she like many turned her activism to women's causes, recognizing that her discrimination had dual facets. That same year, she did a nationwide tour of Australia and New Zealand, speaking in favor of amending the sexual assault crimes statutes and urging acceptance. She recognised that consciousness raising sessions were a means for women to develop self-confidence and explore the dynamics of power in their own lives as well as society, as each individual woman's life was a microscopic view of how politics shaped their choices. She was active in the Women's Liberation Movement from 1972 through the end of the 1990s. When she retired from activism, in the Sydney Women's Liberation group, Wills gave a complete set of the organization's archival records to the State Library of New South Wales to allow academic access to the records.

Wills completed her PhD with a dissertation, The politics of women's liberation in 1981 at the University of Sydney, where she had been working as a tutor in the Department of Government. In 1984, she became the Equal Opportunity Officer at Macquarie University in Sydney and as an academic pursued research on sexual violence. Of particular interest to her was the intersection of sex and violence and the relationship to pornography. She wrote articles analysing the cultural norm, which promoted not only men's right to demand sex, but propagated fantasies of sexually dominating both women and other men. Wills proposed that violence depicted in pornographic media might be related to backlash from the women's movement, but that the topic was too complex to limit causation to one facet of societal development.

Wills was one of the activists featured in the 2005 film The Hidden History of Homosexual Australia. In 2006, she was a senior lecturer, teaching politics and public policy at Macquarie University. In 2009, she was a featured panelist at the 40th anniversary celebrations for Australia's gay pride and in 2010, was honored along with Watson as a Community Hero in the annual Honour Awards of the AIDS Council of New South Wales (ACON).

== Death and legacy ==
Wills died on 26 August 2022. She is remembered for her activism on LGBT and women's rights.
