= Lance Gowland =

- Born: November 4, 1935
- Died: October 6, 2008 (aged 72)
- Occupations: LGBT rights activist, unionist, peace activist and Communist Party member
- Known for: Member of the Campaign Against Moral Persecution

Lance Gowland (1935–2008) was an Australian LGBT rights activist, unionist, peace activist and Communist Party member. He was a member of the Campaign Against Moral Persecution (CAMP) and as one of the organisers drove the truck in the first Sydney Gay and Lesbian Mardi Gras.

== Early life ==
Lancelot Joseph Gowland was born on 4 November 1935. He was the second son of George and Winifred Gowland. From an early age Lance became involved in the Eureka Youth League and the anti apartheid and peace movements. He attended Westmead High School.

== Activism ==
Gowland travelled to Europe, the United States and Israel and became involved with the British Communist Party and the peace movement. He witnessed Martin Luther King Jr. delivering his I have a dream speech in 1963 on the steps of the Lincoln Memorial in Washington. He participated in Australia’s first public demonstration for gay liberation, the International Women’s Day march in 1971.

Gowland drove the truck leading the first Sydney Mardi Gras Gowland's experiences were recreated in the telemovie "Riot". Gowland was involved in organising the second Mardi Gras parade in 1979, and remained involved until 1984, the year homosexuality was decriminalised in New South Wales.

A member of the Campaign Against Moral Persecution (CAMP), Gowland volunteered for the telephone counselling service established by Peter de Waal and Peter Bonsall-Boone. Gowland was active in the communist organisations in Sydney and built support the gay rights issues.

Gowland was one of the group known as the “78ers” who participated in the events in Sydney in 1978 including the first Sydney Gay and Lesbian Mardi Gras parade, protests at Darlinghurst and Central Police Stations and Central Court, and marches through the city.

== Career ==
Gowland worked on the Snowy Mountains Scheme and as a public servant.

== Personal life ==
Before realising he was gay, Gowland married and had three children. He remained close with his children and grandchildren after he separated from his wife and subsequently survived his long-term partner, Dr Jim Walker. Gowland died on 6 October 2008.
