= Lex Watson =

LGBT rights activist

Lex Watson AM
- Born: Alexander Watson; 29 January 1943; Perth, Western Australia
- Died: 6 May 2014 (aged 71)
- Education: University of Western Australia; University of Sydney
- Occupations: Historian and political scientist
- Known for: LGBT rights activism

Alexander "Lex" Watson, AM (29 January 1943 – 6 May 2014), was an Australian LGBT rights activist, historian and political scientist. Born and first educated in Perth, Western Australia, Watson spent most of his life working for and then later the cataloguing of, gay law reform and the gay rights movement in New South Wales and Australia.

== Background and early years ==
Alexander Watson was born in Perth, Western Australia, the son of a doctor, Alec Watson, and Margaret Newnham, a nurse. Originally educated in Geraldton, Watson moved with his family to Perth and, despite the wishes of his parents, was further educated at Perth Modern School. Watson won a scholarship to the University of Western Australia in 1960, where he studied for a Bachelor of Arts reading history and philosophy. For his honours year in 1964, Watson transferred to the government department at the University of Sydney, where he took a position teaching Australian politics.

== Career ==
After coming out at an early age, Watson became involved in early movements to establish gay advocacy groups pushing for decriminalisation in New South Wales, spurred on after the Sexual Offences Act 1967 decriminalised homosexual acts in England and Wales. Watson was in Canberra three years later when the ACT Homosexual Law Reform Society was formed, which he immediately joined. However, much closer to home Watson was much more heavily involved in the establishment of the Campaign Against Moral Persecution (CAMP), which was Australia's first openly homosexual group, formed in September 1970. In early 1972, Watson became co-president with Sue Wills. In this role he spoke against the use of aversion therapy and psychosurgery then practised against women and homosexuals, prior to the removal of homosexuality from the American Psychiatric Association's Diagnostic and Statistical Manual of Mental Disorders in 1973. Watson also organised the first gay demonstration, held outside the Liberal Party headquarters in Ash Street, Sydney in October 1971. Serving as co-president until 1975, Watson remained a member of CAMP until 1977 when he resigned as the organisation gradually moved to focus on its phone-counselling service.

Watson nevertheless continued his activism and was a regular contributor to the gay press, such as the Sydney Star. In 1976 he notably appeared on the ABC's Monday Conference program in Mt Isa, debating the topic of gay rights, in front of a partly hostile audience with one member throwing faeces at him. Watson maintained his composure throughout and won over the audience. In 1980, with Craig Johnston (politician), Watson helped establish the Gay Rights Lobby (GRL) (now known as the NSW Gay and Lesbian Rights Lobby) group, and began the push to decriminalise homosexual acts under the Crimes Act 1900. Watson, in a dispute over tactics and his administrative style, fell out with GRL, but continued his activism work outside the group. With the growing recognition of the threat of HIV/AIDS for the gay community, Watson helped to form the AIDS Action Committee in mid-1983, which later transformed into the AIDS Council of NSW (ACON), serving as its first president. In late 1984, the Federal Minister for Health Neal Blewett established the National Advisory Council on AIDS, with Watson being named as one of its first members.

Watson was a member of a delegation to Premier Neville Wran in May 1984 on the morning of the introduction of his Private Members Bill called the Crimes (Amendment) Act 1984, to decriminalise homosexuality. Watson attempted to persuade the Premier to introduce an equal age of consent clause and when Wran refused, he argued for the inclusion of protections for persons between the ages of 16 and 18 years, which Wran agreed to.

== Honours ==
In 2010, together with Sue Wills, he received ACON's Community Hero Award. In retirement, Watson became involved with Sydney's Pride History Group, Sydney's gay and lesbian history organisation, and was president from 2010 until his death. In February 2014 Watson objected to claims from members of the Labor Party that they were solely responsible for the decriminalisation of homosexuality in NSW: "Credit goes to a handful of individuals, initially all Labor and some minor party independents. We should acknowledge George Petersen in particular, Frank Walker, Jack Ferguson and Barrie Unsworth [...] Neville Wran, while personally in favour of homosexual law reform, bungled it badly and was only constructive at the end, in 1984 [...] It was a demonstration of ineptitude and failure of leadership by numerous MPs and to the glory of no major party."

On his death on 6 May 2014, the president of ACON Mark Orr noted that "Lex was a dedicated and courageous pioneer whose work laid the foundations for a more authentic, caring and inclusive society, and for that he has earned himself pride of place in the history of our community [...] His work in relation to LGBT rights was ground-breaking, and throughout his life the outcomes he helped achieve in relation to law reform and community health have been significant and enduring."

In the 2014 Queen's Birthday Honours, Watson was appointed a Member of the Order of Australia (AM) for "significant service to the community as an advocate for gay and lesbian rights." Watson had been aware of the award before it was gazetted, but died before he could be presented with the honour. It was granted with effect from 12 November 2012.

== Selected published works ==
- Watson, Lex (1979). "The United Australia Party and its sponsors". In Hazlehurst, Cameron (ed.). Australian Conservatism: Essays in Twentieth Century Political History. Canberra: Australian National University Press. pp. 71–109. ISBN 0708113591.
- Watson, Lex (July 1979). "Gay rights legislation". Current Affairs Bulletin. 56: 19–25. ISSN 0011-3182.
- Watson, Lex (27 October 1984). "Living with AIDS -Acquired Immune Deficiency Syndrome-". Medical Journal of Australia. 141 (9): 559–560. doi:10.5694/j.1326-5377.1984.tb113137.x. ISSN 0025-729X. PMID 6092879. S2CID 46017623.
- Watson, Lex (7 February 1985). "AIDS Task Force: the Peter Principle in operation -Criticism of the Task Force-". Star. 6 (16): 6–23.
- Watson, Lex (September 1986). "The Senate: an uneasy compromise: government. -Radical reform: a second look at the constitution". Australian Society. 5 (9): 33–34.
- Watson, Lex (October–November 1988). "Out of the closet, into the nineties: life after AIDS". Australian Left Review (107): 12–13, 15. ISSN 0004-9638.
- Conell, R. W.; Crawford, June; Kippax, Susan; Dowsett, G. W.; Baxter, Don; Watson, Lex; Berg, R. (October 1989). "Facing the epidemic: changes in the sexual lives of gay and bisexual men in Australia and their implications for AIDS prevention strategies". Social Problems. 36 (4): 384–402. doi:10.1525/sp.1989.36.4.03a00050. ISSN 0037-7791.
- Watson, Lex; Smith, Rodney, eds. (1989). Politics in Australia. Sydney: Allen & Unwin. ISBN 0043640273.
- Watson, Lex (1990). The Condom Project: Testing the Market. Sydney: Department of Public Health, University of Sydney.
