= Society Five =

Society Five was a gay rights and social support organisation formed in Melbourne, Australia, in January 1971. Initially known as Campaign Against Moral Persecution, after the Sydney-based organisation that inspired it, the group was soon renamed Society Five. For a decade it campaigned on behalf of Melbourne's gay community, as well as offering a telephone counselling service. By 1977 it was matched in strength by the Homosexual Law Reform Coalition. By 1981 it had disbanded, following internal conflicts.

== See also ==
- LGBT history
- LGBT rights in Australia
- List of LGBT rights organizations
