= Ron Austin =

Australian LGBT rights activist

Ron Austin (1929 – 13 April 2019) was an Australian LGBT rights activist, who was known for being one of the founders of the Sydney Gay and Lesbian Mardi Gras in 1978.

== Early life and education ==
Ronald Patrick Austin grew up in Maitland, New South Wales and was the oldest of five children. He entered the Redemptorist monastery in Mayfield, Newcastle at the age of 16 but left in 1951. He enrolled in the National Art School in Newcastle before moving to Darlinghurst, Sydney to enroll in the National Art School there.

== Activism ==
Austin was an early member of the Campaign Against Moral Persecution (CAMP) group, an LGBTIQ rights activism group working to end discrimination against members of the LGBTIQ community, having joined in 1971. In 1978, this group were planning protests in support of LGBTIQ rights.

From 21–27 May 1978, 900 people attended Sydney's first gay film festival at the Paris Theatre. One of the films, Word is Out, which included footage from the San Francisco Freedom Day Parade inspired Austin, a member of CAMP, with the idea of a street party which later became the first Mardi Gras in June of that year. The suggestion that the demonstrations should be a street party led to the first march on 24 June 1978. His friend Lance Gowland assisted with obtaining the permit, driving the truck and setting up the sound system. 53 people were arrested for participating. This event became a catalyst for a series of protests and led to the repeal in April 1979 of the NSW Summary Offences Act, under which the arrests had been made. The Mardi Gras became an annual event, and Austin marched in every parade for decades.

== Death and legacy ==
Austin died on 13 April 2019, at the age of 90. The Mardi Gras Awards, given out annually, include the Ron Austin Award for Most Fabulous Parade Entry.
