= Peter De Waal =

Australian LGBT rights activist

Peter de Waal AM (born 1938) is an Australian LGBT rights activist and author. He was a foundation member of the Campaign Against Moral Persecution (CAMP) and participated in the first Sydney Gay and Lesbian Mardi Gras.

== Biography ==
Peter De Waal was born in 1938. As lifelong activists for the gay and lesbian community in Sydney, de Waal and his partner Peter Bonsall-Boone shared Australia's first televised gay male kiss, established a counselling service from their Balmain home and confronted police during the first Sydney Mardi Gras parade in 1978.

de Waal is one of the group known as the “78ers” who participated in the events in Sydney in 1978 including the first Sydney Gay and Lesbian Mardi Gras parade, protests at Darlinghurst and Central Police Stations and Central Court, and marches through the city. He attended the New South Wales State Parliament formal bipartisan apology to the 78ers on 25 February 2016.

== Works ==
- de Waal, Peter; Gay and Lesbian Immigration Task Force NSW (2002), Lesbians and gays changed Australian immigration : history and herstory, Gay and Lesbian Immigration Task Force NSW, ISBN 978-0-9580270-0-7
- de Waal, Peter; GLITF (NSW) (1998), When only the best will do : a study of lesbian and gay immigration, GLITF NSW, ISBN 978-0-646-35435-4
- de Waal, Peter; New South Wales. Supreme Court (2007), Unfit for publication : NSW Supreme Court and other bestiality, buggery and sodomy trials 1727-1930, P. de Waal, ISBN 978-0-646-47274-4
- de Waal, Peter, 1938-; Black, Ian; Trebilco, Peter; Wills, Sue; Tribunal Working Group (1996), The 1976 Tribunal on Homosexuals and Discrimination and its 1994 review, The Tribunal Working Group, ISBN 978-0-646-20409-3
- de Waal, Peter, 1938- (2025), It Wasn't Dutch Courage, Intertype, ISBN 978-1-763-79236-4

== Awards ==
In June 2017, de Waal and Bonsall-Boone (posthumously) were both inducted as a Member of the Order of Australia in the 2017 Queen's Birthday Honours, "for significant service to the community as an LGBTIQ advocate and supporter, and through a range of volunteer roles."

== See also ==
- Sue Wills
- Jessica Origliasso
- Julie McCrossin
- Salena Rocky Malone
- Bianca Elmir
