= Peter Bonsall-Boone =

Australian LGBT activist (1938–2017)

Peter "Bon" Bonsall-Boone AM (c. 1938 – 19 May 2017) was an Australian LGBT rights activist. He was a foundation member of the Campaign Against Moral Persecution (CAMP) and participated in the first Sydney Gay and Lesbian Mardi Gras.

== Biography ==
Peter was born in 1938 and grew up in Gladesville. When he turned 18 he changed his surname to include both his parents, Winifred Bonsall and Michael Boone. At the age of 19, in 1957, Bonsall-Boone was convicted twice of homosexual activity after being arrested on separate occasions at a public toilet and at a Sydney train station where he went to meet other gay men. He later said that these convictions prevented him from his goal of becoming an Anglican priest; he was expelled from his theological college in 1962 when his criminal record was discovered. He met his life partner, Peter De Waal, in 1966, and they both became foundation members of the Campaign Against Moral Persecution (CAMP), one of the earliest gay rights organisations in Australia. Bonsall-Boon established the religious sub-committee of CAMP known as Cross+Section and served as secretary of CAMP (1972-1974) and was elected co-president in 1974.

In 1972, Bonsall-Boone and De Waal appeared in an episode of the ABC documentary series Chequerboard that featured them kissing briefly. Their kiss has been reported as the first kiss between a same-sex couple on Australian television. At the time, Bonsall-Boone was working as a secretary for St Clements Anglican Church in the Sydney suburb of Mosman; he lost this job as a result of his television appearance. In 1973, Bonsall-Boone and De Waal set up an LGBT help line called Phone-A-Friend from their home. In 1978, Bonsall-Boone participated in a protest that would later be recognised as the inaugural Sydney Gay and Lesbian Mardi Gras.

Bonsall-Boone was one of the group known as the “78ers” who participated in the events in Sydney in 1978 including the first Sydney Gay and Lesbian Mardi Gras parade, protests at Darlinghurst and Central Police Stations and Central Court, and marches through the city.

When Bonsall-Boone was diagnosed with cancer in 2015, he said that his dying wish was to be able to marry De Waal. They campaigned parliament and wrote to the Prime Minister Malcolm Turnbull in 2017 in an attempt to have same-sex marriage legalised, noting: "please do it quickly as Bon's time is fast running out!" Bonsall-Boone died on 19 May 2017, several months after celebrating his 50th anniversary with de Waal.

== Legacy ==
In June 2017, Bonsall-Boone (posthumously) and De Waal were both inducted as a Member of the Order of Australia in the 2017 Queen's Birthday Honours, "for significant service to the community as an LGBTQI advocate and supporter, and through a range of volunteer roles."
