= Campaign Against Moral Persecution =

LGBT activism group

The Campaign Against Moral Persecution (also known as CAMP or CAMP Inc.) was an LGBT activism group. It was officially established on 6 February 1971, at the first public gathering of gay women and men in Australia, which took place in a church hall in Balmain, New South Wales.

== History ==
CAMP aimed to support gay and lesbian people, raise awareness of challenges facing them, and campaign for an end to discrimination against them. The group was one of the first LGBTI rights groups to be established in Australia. Formed in Sydney, it soon expanded across Australia. Its aims, as expressed in its monthly newsletter, were "to bring about a situation where homosexuals can enjoy good jobs and security in those jobs, equal treatment under the law, and the right to serve our country without fear of exposure and contempt."

John Ware and Christabel Poll appeared in The Australian on the 19 September 1970 announcing the establishment of the CAMP group in an article called ‘Couples’. On 6 February 1971, it was officially established at the first public gathering of homosexual men and women in Australia, which took place in a church hall in Balmain. John Ware and Christabel Poll were confirmed as convenors and spokespeople for the new group.

Branches of CAMP had been established in Brisbane and Melbourne (though it was known as Society 5 there) in February 1971. Soon after branches had been established in all capital cities and on most campuses. CAMP Inc became known as CAMP NSW.

Lex Watson and Sue Wills were the first co-Presidents following a decision to establish a constitution and office-bearers in 1972. Founding members included Lex Watson, Peter de Waal and Peter Bonsall-Boone.

CAMP also published a magazine, CAMP Ink, until 1977.

The group's work included establishing a telephone counselling service called 'Phone-A-Friend', a service that continues as the Gay and Lesbian Counselling Service of NSW. CAMP campaigned for David Widdup, the first openly gay candidate to stand for office, in the seat of Lowe in the 1972 Australian federal election. CAMP held the first public gay rights demonstration in Australia in October 1971.

=== Recognition ===
The group was given the President’s Award at the 2018 Honour LGBTI Community Awards.

Society Five was inspired by the group, and was itself initially known as the Campaign Against Moral Persecution.
