= Mother Clap's Molly House =

2001 play by Mark Ravenhill

Mother Clap's Molly House is a 2001 play by Mark Ravenhill with music by Matthew Scott. It is based on an essay in the book of the same name by Rictor Norton.

The play is a black comedy and explores the diversity of human sexuality. It is set partly in London of the 18th century, where the molly house of Mother Clap caters to the gay subculture, and partly in 2001, at a party organized by a group of gay men. It was first performed in September 2001 at the National Theatre's Lyttelton Theatre. The play was directed by Nicholas Hytner, produced by Phil Cameron, the sets were designed by Giles Cadle and the costumes by Nicky Gillibrand. Among the premiere cast were Dominic Cooper and Con O’Neill.
