= LGBTQ culture in London =

The LGBTQ community in London is one of the largest within Europe. LGBTQ culture of London, England, is centred on Old Compton Street in Soho. There are also LGBTQ pubs and restaurants across London such as in Clapham, Dalston and Kings Cross.

== London in LGBTQ history ==
=== 18th and 19th century ===
In the 18th century some businesspersons and aristocrats had for the time relatively open LGBTQ lifestyles and Rictor Norton author of Mother Clap's Molly House: The Gay Subculture in England, 1700–1830 stated that in the 1720s London had more gay pubs and clubs than it did in 1950.

Most people hid their LGBTQ lifestyle from public view as in the United Kingdom, homosexual acts were illegal prior to the Sexual Offences Act 1967. This illegality meant that many gay men could not live openly as homosexual, and as a result gay cruising provided a way for gay men to solicit sexual encounters while minimizing the risk of being caught by the police. When cruising first became known, it usually took place in public fields, parks, toilets and theatres were also sometimes denounced as cruising grounds by moralists of the time. In the 20th century sex in public toilets in the UK became known as "cottaging" and the toilets where sex occurred were referred to as "cottages". Public toilets located next to highways, main roads or rural roads have also become popular cruising sites.

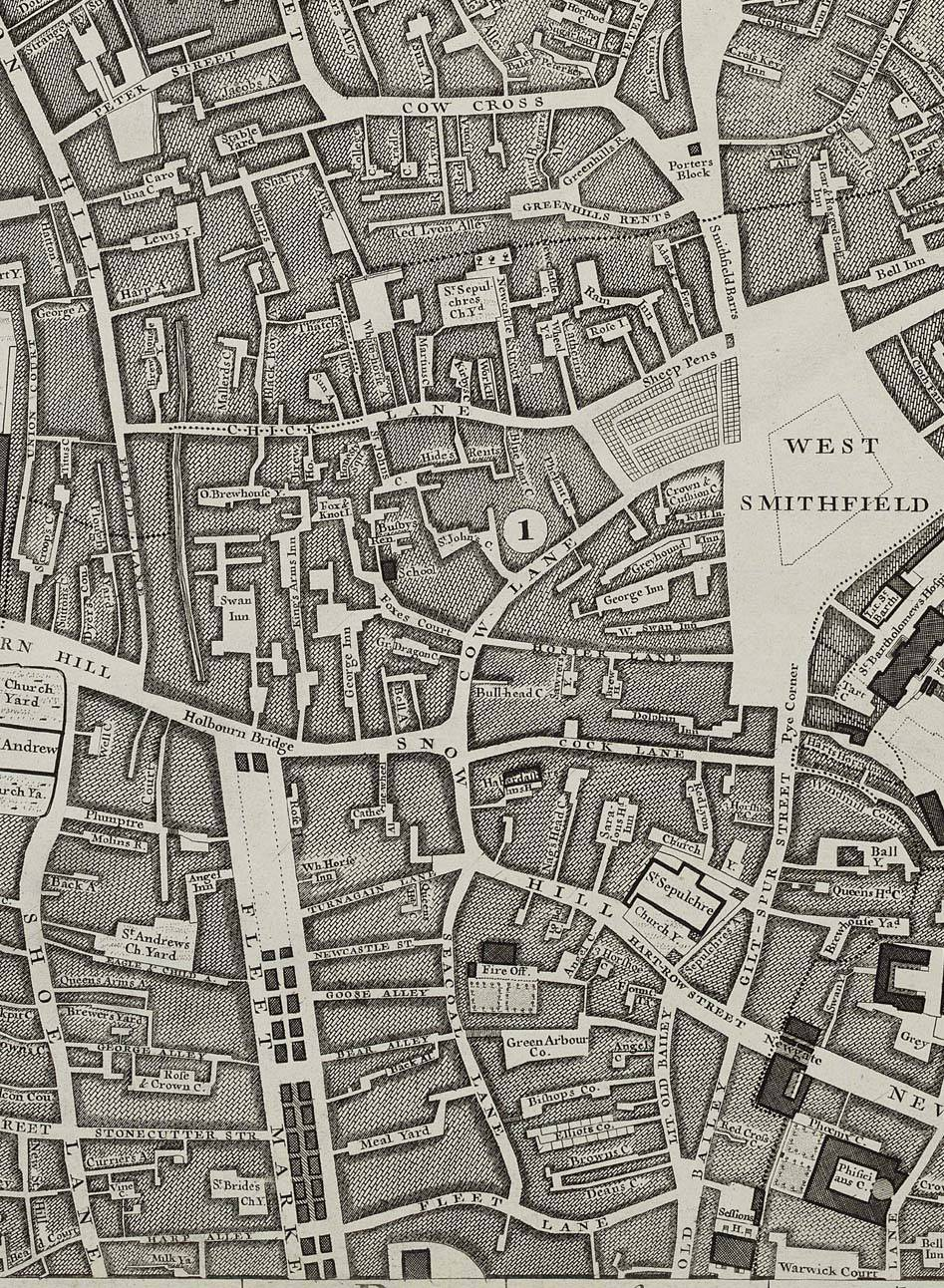
Mother Clap's molly-house was located in Field Lane, Holborn and can be seen on the left side of the map above. Mother Clap's molly-house was the most well known illegal gay brothel in 18th century London and had been open from 1724 to 1726, when a raid sustained by the Societies for the Reformation of Manners had it dismantled and 40 gay men who were present at the molly-house at the time of the raid were taken to Newgate prison where most were eventually set free, although those who weren't were either fined, imprisoned, exhibited in the pillory and three were hanged. Rocque Map of London, 1746.

The illegality of gay sex has meant that the history of gay cruising is sparsely documented, as those who used such cruising grounds were likely to be discreet about them. Rictor Norton, author of Mother Clap's Molly House the title of which is a reference to Margaret Clap's illegal gay brothel known as a "Molly House", believes that the first gay cruising grounds and gay brothels in London may have sprung up in the early 17th century and going from the earliest known records they may have originated even earlier in the late 1600s although they most likely originated much earlier than the 1600s. Mother Clap's molly-house was the most well known of these illegal gay brothels in 18th century London and it had been open from 1724 to 1726, when a raid sustained by the Societies for the Reformation of Manners had it dismantled and 40 gay men who were present at the molly-house at the time of the raid were taken to Newgate prison where most were eventually set free, although those who weren't were either fined, imprisoned, exhibited in the pillory and three were hanged.

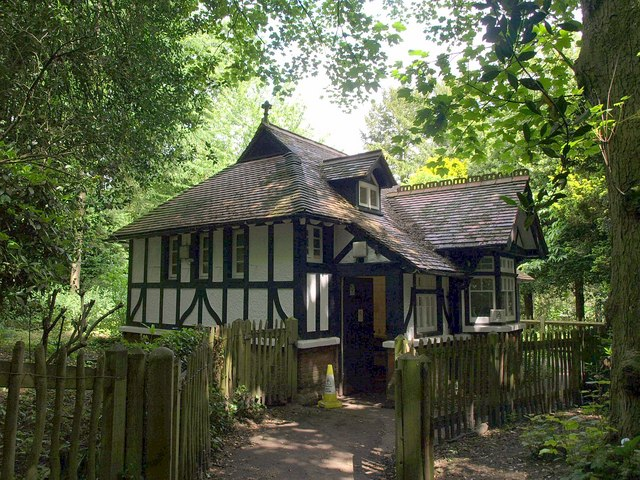
Public toilets on Hampstead Heath, which has been described as "...the most popular cruising area in London" that has a long history of gay cruising going back to the 18th century. In response to a 2006 News of the World story alleging that George Michael had sex on Hampstead Heath, Michael responded "I went out last Tuesday night and uh, came off of Hampstead Heath, I don't even remember if I got any action right,...I don't suppose this will be much of a... story. Which I don't suppose it would have been without the addition of a completely fabricated encounter... ." Photo taken 2013

Author Mark Turner comments that evidence of gay cruising goes back to at least the 18th century and has commented that "From St James's Park in the 18th century to Hampstead Heath today, gay men have always gone cruising in search of sex... ...Cruising is nothing new. It's been going on for hundreds of years, and its history is a part of the history of our cities and public spaces. As cities grew and populations became more anonymous, new opportunities for chance encounters arose, for straight and queer people alike... By night, teenagers hop fences to snog, hookers and rent boys ply their trade, lovers admire the moon, addicts shoot up, and gay men fuck... ...George Michael is right to drop his pants and lay claim to his queer culture - to a history of urban sexual adventure and misadventure that is as old and perverse as the parks themselves." Turner has further commented that in "Thomas Gilbert's 'A View of the Town' from the 18th century, a man leaves his wife in their bridal bed, sneaks off to St James's Park, 'roams in search of some vile ingle prize' and 'courts the foul pathick in the fair one's place'... ...such queer encounters in parks, on embankments, in toilets, streets and back alleys are an integral part of the way our cities - and sexualities - express themselves. Where there is public space, there will be diverse appropriations of it, and so it should be.

LGBTQ studies pre-1920s were entirely of males caught in scandals.

=== 20th century ===
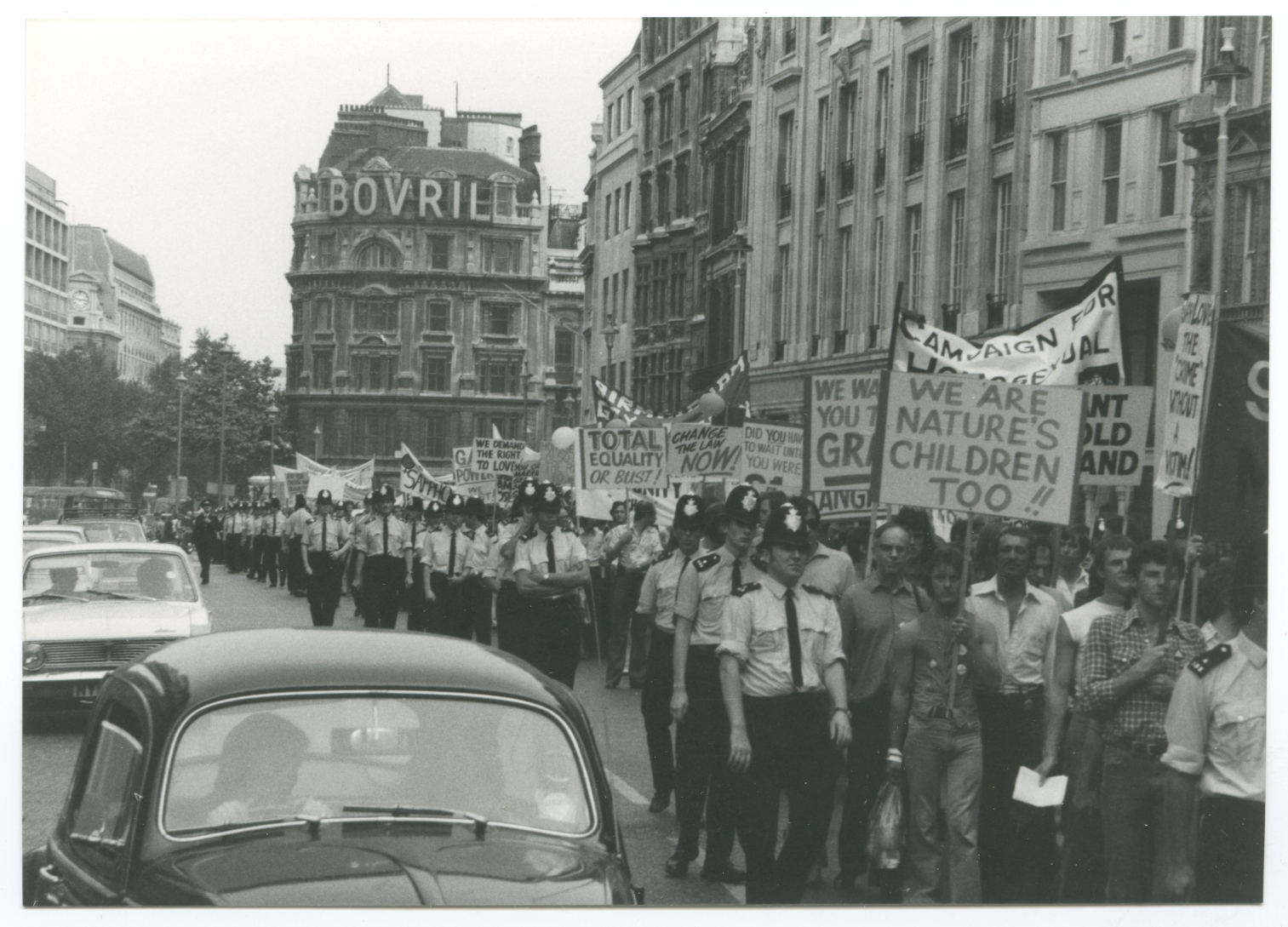
London Gay Pride March in 1974.

Homosexuality was decriminalised in England and Wales in 1967, but London was an LGBTQ tourism destination even before then.

The world's longest running lesbian nightclub, Gateways Club opened in 1936 (it closed in 1985).

The UK branch of the Gay Liberation Front (GLF) held its first meeting in a basement room in the London School of Economics in 1970. The group later organised the first official UK pride protest in 1972, which has since become an annual event and one of the world's largest of its kind. Although the GLF disbanded a mere 4 years later, it nevertheless spawned off several notable LGBTQ organisations such as Gay News (founded 1972), Gay's the Word (1979, via the Icebreakers group) and London Lesbian and Gay Switchboard (1974, now Switchboard).

Wider British cultural movements have influenced LGBTQ culture: for example, the emergence of glam rock in the UK in the early 1970s, via Marc Bolan and David Bowie, saw a generation of teenagers begin playing with the idea of androgyny, and the West End musical The Rocky Horror Show, which debuted in London in 1973, is also widely said to have been an influence on countercultural and sexual liberation movements. The Blitz Kids (which included Boy George) frequented the Tuesday club-night at Blitz in Covent Garden, helping launch the New Romantic subcultural movement in the late 1970s. Today, the annual London Pride Parade and the London Lesbian and Gay Film Festival are held in the city.

Switchboard, one of the oldest UK-wide LGBTQ+ telephone helplines in the UK, was founded in 1974 in Housmans bookshop's basement near King's Cross.

Mark W. Turner, the author of "Gay London," stated that when Derek Jarman moved to Charing Cross in 1979, it began the process of Soho becoming the centre of the London LGBTQ community and that by the early 1990s this was "firmly established".

On May 24, 1989, exactly one year after the Thatcherite anti-homosexuality Section 28 legislation became law, the London-founded charity Stonewall formally announced its formation. The charity had started its life in Ian McKellen's home in Limehouse. Today, it is Europe's largest LGBTQ rights organisation.

The Admiral Duncan pub in Soho was bombed on 30 April 1999. Newspaper articles stated the belief that the bombing was intended to attack the LGBTQ community; no persons who died in the incident were members of the local LGBTQ community.

=== 21st century ===
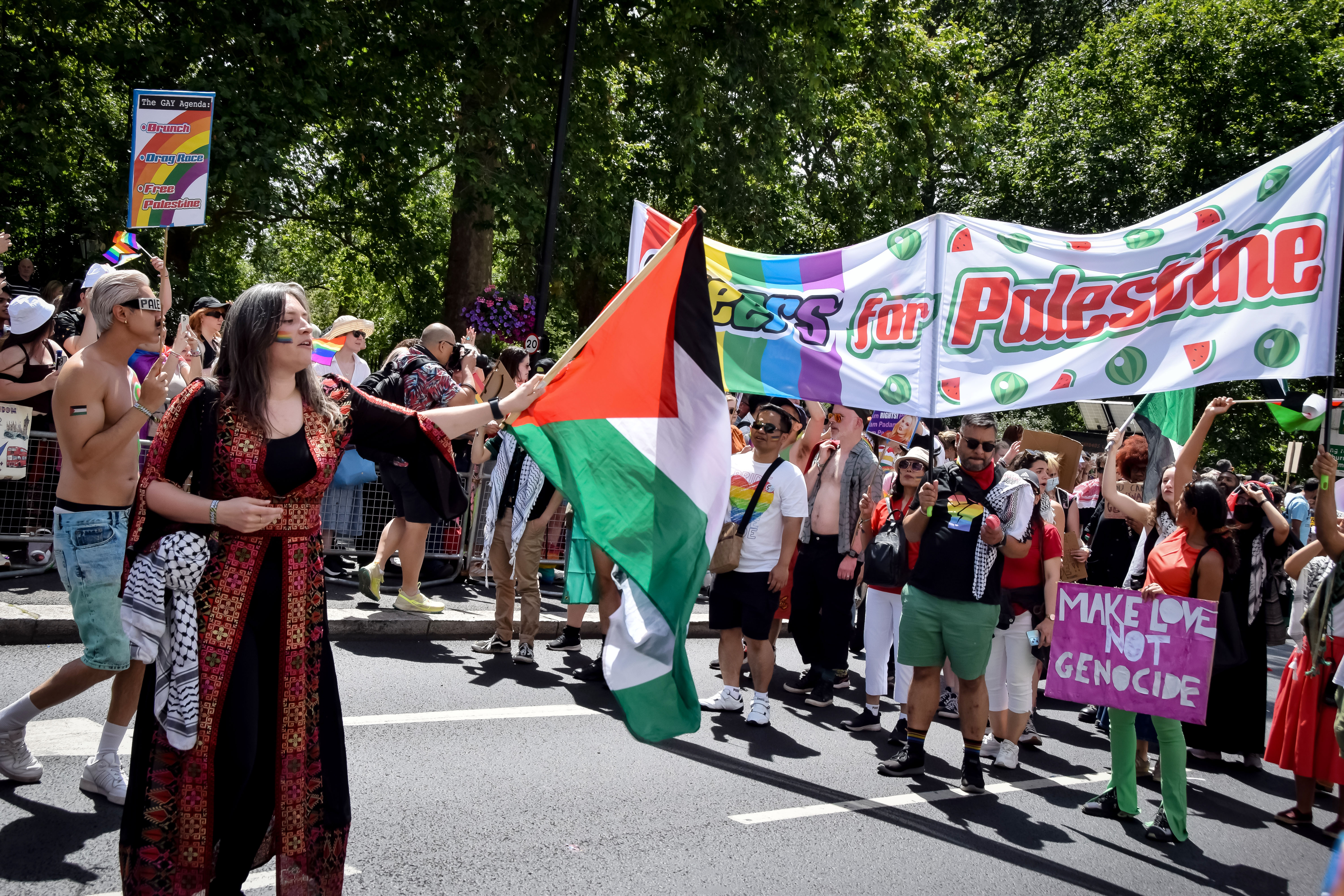
LGBTQ Pride Parade in London in 2024

The popstar George Michael commented in 2004 that he began cruising for gay sex in London when he was 16 in 1979 and he further commented that, "When I made the 'Outside' video I knew I was helping a whole generation of 15-year-olds who are cruising and dying of shame about it. I felt that lightening the stigma around cruising was the most immediately beneficial thing I could do. I know for a fact that when I was 16, 17, when I started cruising, that watching the 'Outside' video would have taken some of the weight off my shoulders." Michael further went on to comment that cruising for gay sex was something that he had done throughout his life, "...that’s the wonderful thing about cruising. The vast majority of men were either married or in the closet. So you have a mutual secret and that’s pretty water tight...If you’re a suburban cruiser like my good self and you like guys that are really straight-acting, then most of the people you pick up...are not going to tell your secret because they’ve got one themselves. I mean, fuck, it worked for years. Interviewer: Was there a moment when people would double-take and realise it was you? Michael: I think probably most of them did. Sometimes we’d talk about it afterwards and have a laugh..."

In 2015, London's LGBTQ Pride Parade attracted over one million people for the first time.

Since 2019, London also hosts an annual trans+ pride march. Having attracted 1,500 protesters in the first year, its attendance grew to more than 20,000 protesters by 2023. The city is also the home of the annual UK Black Pride celebrations.

== Institutions ==
The UK's first gay and lesbian bookshop, Gay's the Word, is located in Bloomsbury. Due to its lasting legacy of activism and community-building, Historic England has deemed it a site of LGBTQ pilgrimage. Another LGBTQ bookshop, The Common Press, opened its doors in 2021 in Shoreditch. London is therefore home to a third of England's LGBTQ bookshops.

The Bishopsgate Institute boasts one of the largest LGBTQ archives in the UK, including archives from Stonewall, Switchboard, as well as the Lesbian and Gay Newsmedia Archive (LAGNA), which includes over 300,000 press cuttings from the straight press from the 1980s onwards. In addition to this, the Bishopsgate Institute also hosts the Museum of Transology, a community archive focusing on transgender, nonbinary and intersex people. It is the world's largest collection of material culture of its kind.

The WayOut Club is London's longest running club night for transgender women.

Since the closure of Above the Stag Theatre, the King's Head Theatre is the UK's only LGBTQ-centric theatre.

== Events ==
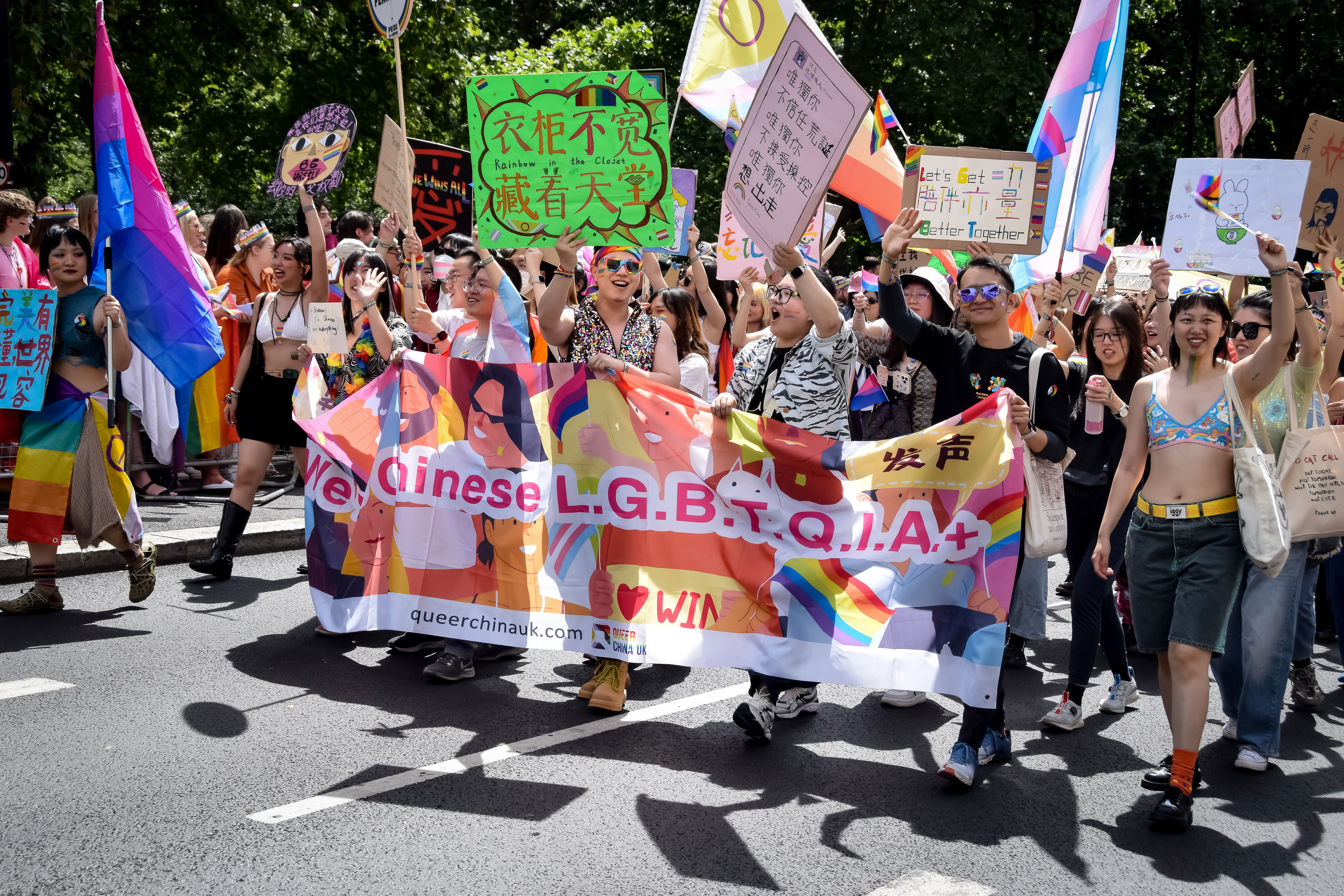
Pride in London on 29 June 2024

=== Pride ===
There are a number of prides and marches in London, for different groups and in local communities, these include:

- Pride in London the mainstream event that occurs every summer.
- UK Black Pride – the largest of its kind in Europe – also takes place in London.
- London Trans Pride protest march takes place annually in June or July.
- UK Bi Pride
- London Dyke March has become semi regular (June in 2025)
- Waltham Forest Pride
- Penge Pride picnic in the park
- Pride in Southwark

Europe's biggest LGBTQ+film festival, the BFI Flare: London LGBTIQ+ Film Festival happens every spring in London.

The Greater London Authority government promotes LGBTQ tourism.

== Night life ==
Heaven is the largest gay disco club in Europe. It opened in 1979.

== Global recognition and rankings ==
London is among the global leaders in LGBTQ culture, inclusion and tourism. The city has been ranked among the world’s most LGBTQ-inclusive cities in international indices measuring LGBTQ inclusion and economic competitiveness, and is recognised alongside cities such as New York City, Boston, Toronto, Dublin, Stockholm, Amsterdam and Tel Aviv for its large-scale Pride events and international LGBTQ tourism.

== Notable residents ==
Those identifying as LGBTQIA+:

- Alan Carr
- Alan Turing (1912-1954)
- Boy George
- David Walliams
- Derek Jarman
- Dustin Lance Black
- Freddie Mercury (1946-1991)
- George Michael (1963-2016)
- Graham Norton
- Ian McKellen
- Kae Tempest
- Munroe Bergdorf
- Marc Almond
- Margaret Clap (operated a Molly house)
- Matt Lucas
- Ncuti Gatwa
- Oscar Wilde (1854-1900)
- Paul O'Grady
- Pete Burns (1959 – 2016)
- Peter Tatchell
- Phyll Opoku-Gyimah
- Sakima
- Samantha Fox
- Stephen Fry
- Tom Daley
- Travis Alabanza
- Virginia Woolf (1882-1941)
- Will Young

== See also ==
- Cottaging
- Gay cruising in England and Wales
- Timeline of LGBTQ history in the United Kingdom
