= Margaret Clap =

English innkeeper

- Died: c. 1726
- Other names: Mother Clap
- Occupation: Coffee house operator
- Known for: Running a popular molly house in the early 18th century

Margaret Clap (died c. 1726), better known as Mother Clap, ran a coffee house from 1724 to 1726 in Field Lane, Holborn, Middlesex, a short distance from the City of London. As well as running a molly house (an inn or tavern primarily frequented by homosexual men), she was heavily involved in the ensuing legal battles after her premises were raided and shut down. While not much is known about her life, she was an important part of the gay subculture of early 18th-century England. At the time sodomy in England was a crime under the Buggery Act 1533, punishable by a fine, imprisonment, or the death penalty. Despite this, particularly in larger cities, private homosexual activity took place. To service these actions there existed locations where men from all classes could find partners or just socialize, called molly houses, "molly" being slang for a gay man at the time. One of the most famous of these was Clap's molly house.

== Clap's molly house ==
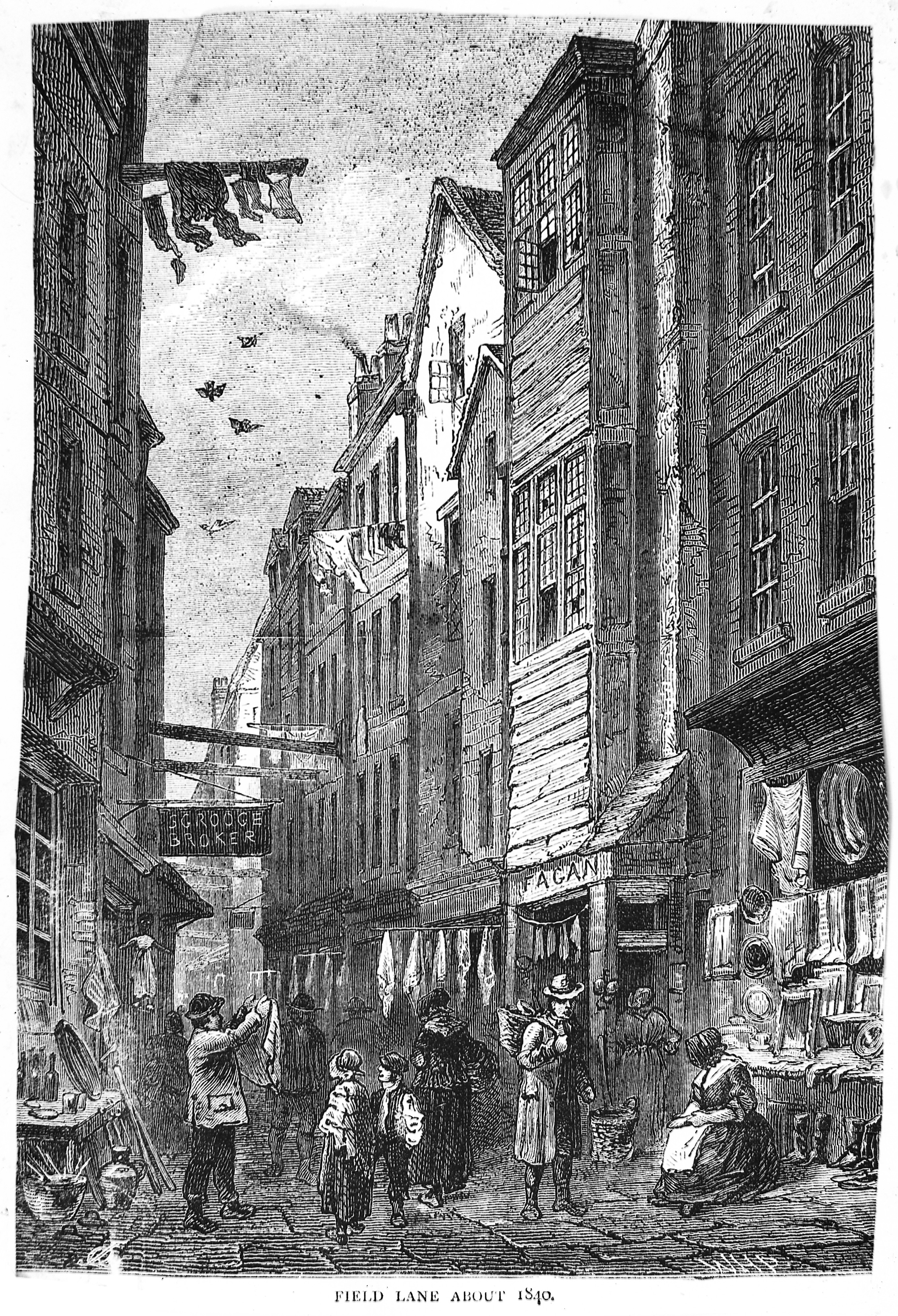
Field Lane in 1840, near to where Clap's molly house was located.

Margaret Clap ran a coffee house that served as a molly house for the underground homosexual community. Her house was popular during the two years of its existence (1724–1726), being well known within the homosexual community. She cared for her customers, and catered especially to the homosexual men who frequented it. She was known to have provided "beds in every room of the house" and commonly had "thirty or forty of such Kind of Chaps every Night, but more especially on Sunday Nights." Clap was present during the vast majority of the molly house's operational hours, apparently only leaving to run across the street to a local tavern, to buy drinks for her customers. Because Clap had to leave the premises to retrieve alcohol to serve to her customers, it is likely that the molly house was hosted in her own private residence. Unlike other molly houses, it was not a brothel. Clap's intentions may have been based more upon pleasure than profit, judging by her goodwill towards her customers. For example, one man lodged at her house for two years and she later provided false testimony to get a man acquitted of sodomy charges. Her actions during the charges later laid against her and many of the homosexual community showed her loyalty to her customers.

=== Raid of 1726 ===
In February 1726, Margaret Clap's molly house was raided by the police; around 40 of its occupants were arrested. Primarily targeted by the Society for the Reformation of Manners, the house had been under surveillance for two years. (Note: Some sources say the house had only been surveilled for a year prior to the raid.) The surveillance seems to have been instigated by a collection of vengeful mollies-turned-informants. A man named Mark Patridge was outed by his lover and was then turned as an informant for the police. He led policemen into molly houses, introducing each of them as his "husband" so that they could investigate more thoroughly. (Note: The idea of calling a molly's lover their husband was based on the faux-marriages that took place at some molly houses, often with a man playing a priest, and others acting as bridesmaids.) Patridge was not tried in court for sodomy. Another notable informant was Thomas Newton, who frequently used entrapment to allow constables to arrest men in the act of instigating sodomy.

According to Rictor Norton:

She was found guilty as charged and was sentenced to stand in the pillory in Smithfield Market, to pay a fine of 20 marks, and to two years' imprisonment. During her punishment, she fell off the pillory once and fainted several times. It is not known what became of her, if indeed she survived prison.
