= Molly house =

Meeting place for homosexual men in 18th and 19th century England

In 18th- and 19th-century Britain, a molly house or molly-house was a meeting place for homosexual men. The meeting places were generally taverns, public houses, coffeehouses or even private rooms where patrons could either socialise or meet possible sexual partners.

Despite the reputation of molly-houses as places having primarily sexual connotations, rather than as social meeting places, some historians are reluctant to classify them specifically as brothels. Rictor Norton, for example, argues that the regular customers could have been in fact mutual friends, at least at the beginning, since consistent evidence concerning male prostitution seems to be insufficient in Britain until the 1780s.

From 1533 onwards, homosexual relations and sexual activities were illegal in England and were frequently prosecuted, with homosexual sexual activities being included in the offence categories of buggery and sodomy (the terms which were often used interchangeably), they remained capital offences until 1861. From the 16th century onwards until 1861, particularly during the 1720s, molly-houses came to be the scenes of raids and arrests, and their customers frequently became targets for blackmail.

Molly-houses can be considered a precursor to some types of contemporary meeting places for the gay community, such as cottaging.

== Etymology ==
The word molly (also spelt as molley, mollie, mally) is a pet-form of the female forename Mary, and had two main connotations in 18th century English. The first one is close to the word moll, designating a lower-class girl or woman, occasionally a prostitute. The second one is classified as slang, defining an effeminate, usually homosexual, male. Along with the possible perception of intrinsic sexual and female features deriving from the association with the name Mary, another possible origin of this denomination for a homosexual man could be found in the Latin form mollis, indicating the supposed passive-effeminate partner in male homosexual relationships. In a 1762 Swedish/English dictionary by Jacob Serenius and in a 1767 French/English dictionary by Thomas Nugent the word was present, but simply defined a sodomite, without effeminate connotations.

Other uses of the word can be seen in the verb to molly (to have homosexual intercourse), in the expressions mollycot (a British regional expression indicating man interested in activities traditionally associated with women) and Miss Molly (referring to an effeminate or homosexual male). The Kent tradition of Hoodening includes the participation of a Molly; a male who takes on womanhood for the night. She is referenced (often humorously) in hoodening songs.

== History ==
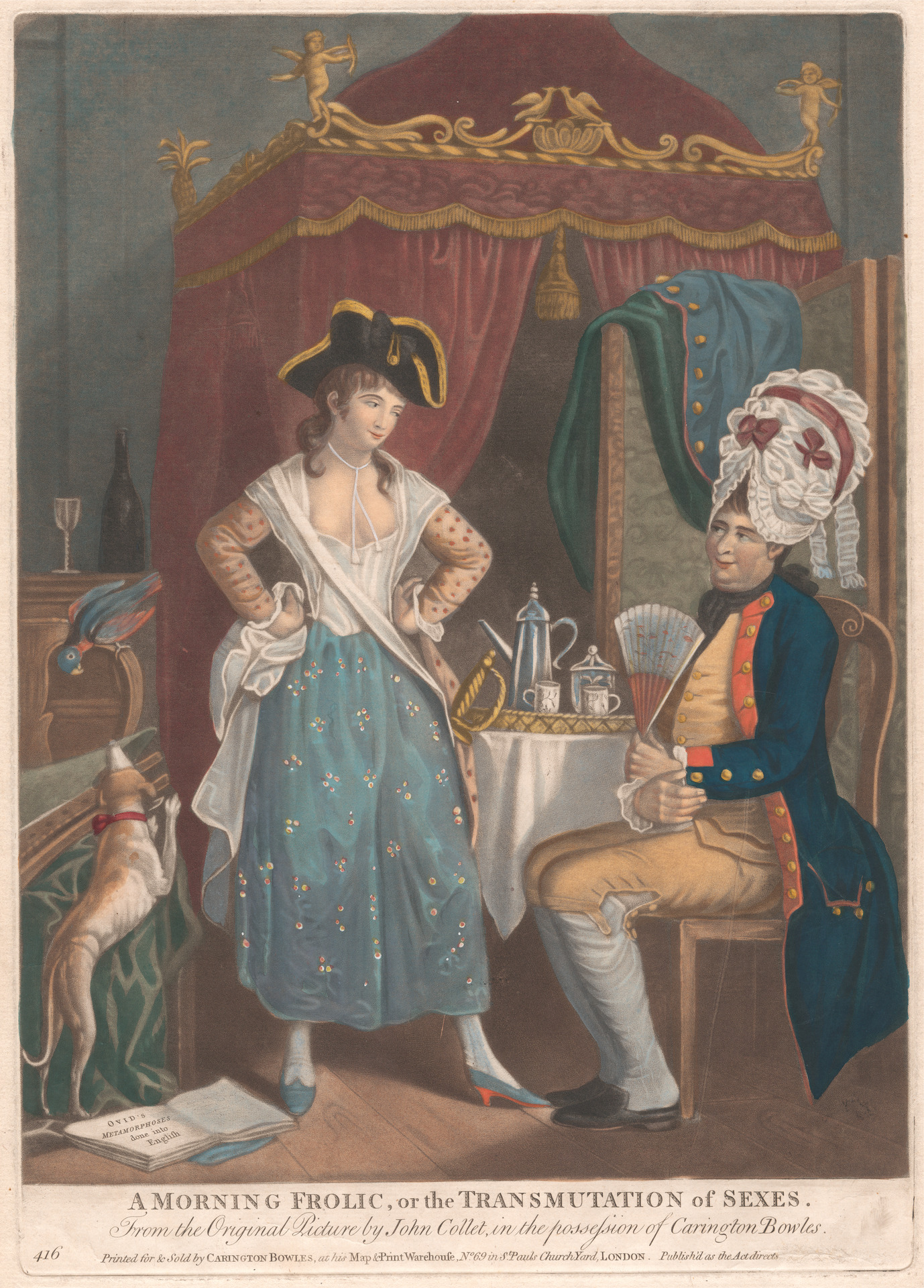
A parodic cartoon depicting male and female crossdressing, c. 1780, after a work by John Collet

=== Gender issues in 18th century London ===
According to one historian, English society of Georgian era accorded high importance to the concepts of family and household as fundamental units for reproduction, subsistence and interaction between generations: in this context, male and female roles evolved into more static forms. Men were associated with an active, assertive role both in sexual behaviour and in managing the household, while women were "defined in terms of their maternal functions", contrarily to a tradition common at the start of the century, attributing them features related to lustfulness and aggressiveness in sexual matters. It is possible to see that the notion of molly-house was rooted in the emergence of a distinctive identity according to gender and sexual orientation, a peculiar social phenomenon considered crucial by some critics in gender studies.
As stated by Robert Shoemaker, "... any activity (such as homosexual intercourse), in which [men] could be seen as acting passively was further marginalised".

Some of the activities popular among the homosexual community, that were seemingly taking place in molly-houses (by nature, marginalised meeting places), were often associated both to female roles and to a family environment (e.g. cross-dressing, "marriage" and "mock birth" rituals, as described in a satire work of the time, Edward Ward's Satyrical Reflections on Clubs, Chapter XXV "Of the Mollies Club").

=== Molly-houses and the homosexual subculture in London ===
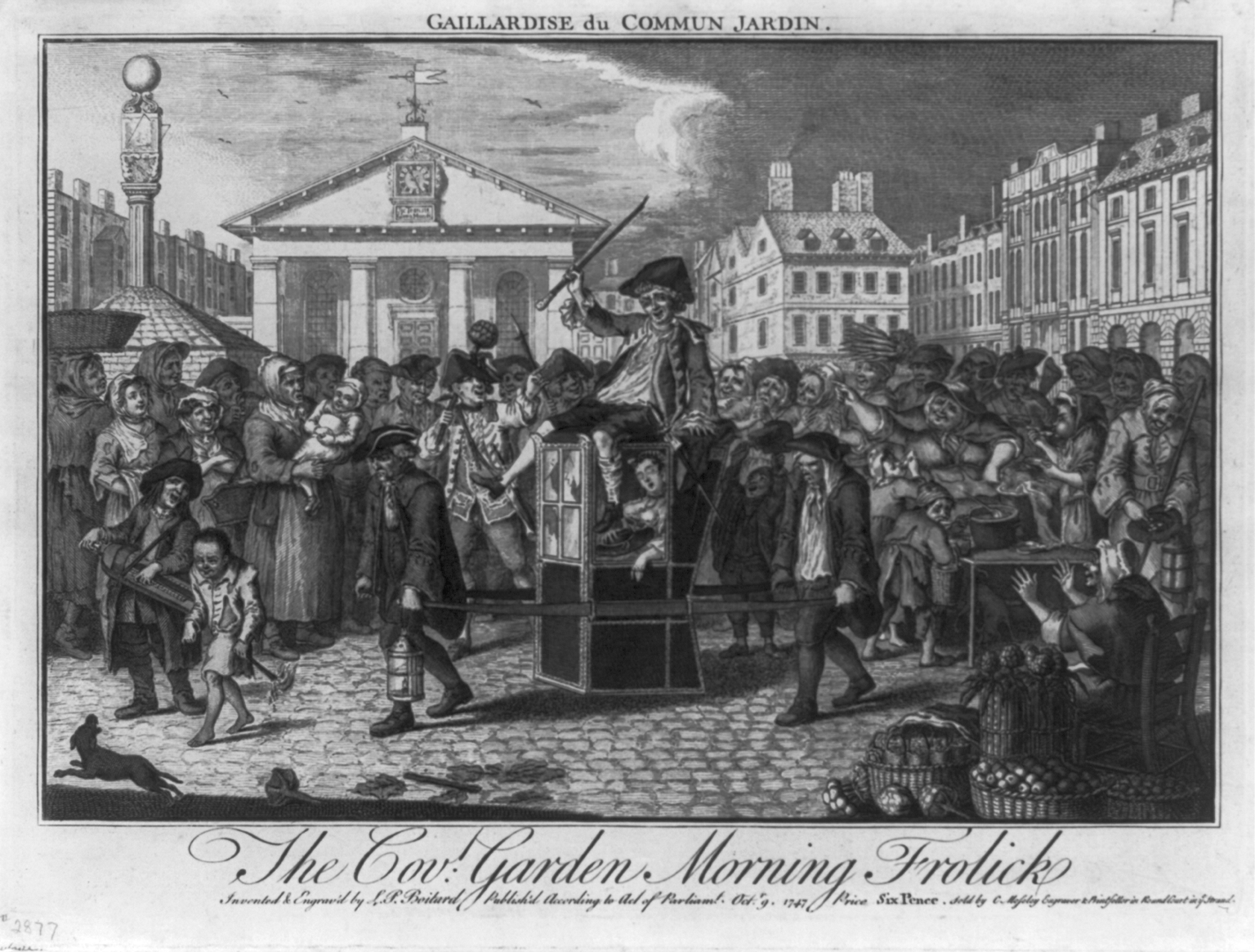
Covent Garden in 1747, in Louis Peter Boitard's satirical print The Covt. Garden morning frolick. Gaillardise du Commun Jardin

As sodomy was a capital offence, the organisation of homosexual men and their activities had to be a crucial point, in order to keep the community as safe as possible from prosecution. As a consequence, molly districts seemed to appear, and eventually grow, in areas in which their business could be acknowledged and tolerated at the same time: such connivance could be often found in areas with a high rate of criminal acts such as theft and prostitution.

An editorial in The London Journal singled out a number of areas:

- The arcades of Covent Garden and the Royal Exchange;
- Moorfields (the path crossing the middle of these fields was known as the Sodomites' Walk);
- Lincoln's Inn and its bog-house, as recorded in trials.
- The south side of St James's Park, a popular cruising ground frequented by soldiers from the nearby barracks and homosexual habitués.

The presence of pillories punishing sodomitical offences, ironically, identified the sites where such acts frequently took place. Pillories were often organised near the crime locations attributed to the accused.

Molly-houses could be considered the most organised phenomenon of London 18th-century homosexual subculture. They were enclosed, private spaces gathering individuals with a common purpose, i.e. socializing and seeking pleasure with partners of the same sex.

=== Law enforcement and sources of information ===
Before 1533, the "unnatural sin" (also defined "detestable crime" in trial records) of sodomy or buggery, (a specific common law offence, meaning anal intercourse between a man and another man or woman, or anal or vaginal intercourse with a beast – in this way encompassing both sodomy and bestiality) was dealt with by the ecclesiastical courts. From that year however, the country's first civil sodomy law was introduced as An Acte for the punishment of the vice of Buggerie (Buggery Act 1533), and also criminal courts could prosecute individuals accused of such crimes. According to the Old Bailey Online Proceedings site:

In order to obtain a conviction, it was necessary to prove that both penetration and ejaculation had occurred, and two witnesses were required to prove the crime. Both the "active" and "passive" partner could be found guilty of this offence. But due to the difficulty of proving this actual penetration and ejaculation many men were prosecuted with the reduced charge of assault with sodomitical intent.

From the late 1690s to the early 1710s, the Societies for the Reformation of Manners (organizations born after the Revolution in 1688, seeking to eliminate immorality and disrespect for religion from public life) actively pursued prostitutes, Sabbath breakers and also homosexual men, through the means of spies and provocateurs to dismantle molly houses and prosecute individuals. In the 1720s and 30s thief-takers like Charles Hitchen and Jonathan Wild stimulated the Societies' activities. The peak of this wave of prosecution is to be recognized in the late 1720s with a raid on the most famous molly house, Mother Clap's. According to Rictor Norton:

The organized molly subculture was effectively suppressed by the mid-1730s. However, molly houses began to reappear again after 1750.

Because sodomy was a capital offence, most of the information concerning molly-houses and the community around them is available through an indirect form, that is, mostly through newspaper reports and the accounts given during the Old Bailey trials relating to sexual offences, such as sodomy, assault with sodomitical intent and keeping a brothel, or sometimes the ones related to theft cases (for example, in cases with men caught stealing during a sexual encounter).

Other important sources include satires and pamphlets, such as An Answer To A Late Insolent Libel by Jonathan Wild, Edward Ward's Satyrical Reflections on Clubs, Chapter XXV Of the Mollies Club, John Dunton's The He-Strumpets. A Satyr on the Sodomite-Club, James Dalton's A Genuine Narrative of all the Street Robberies Committed since October last.

Later in the eighteenth century, waves of prosecutions can be identified in the 1750s and 1770s. However most of the details concerning sexual offences trials came to be more and more rare owing to a trend for a strait-laced morality, but fraud and extortion cases seemed to continue in giving retail at length detailed accounts of alleged sexual encounters between men.

=== Activities ===
The adoption of specific codes and rituals in relating to each other seemed to be another feature allowing cohesion in the group. These peculiarities were often described in trials and libels, often to be put on public display and disapproval. Some of the uses seemed to be:

- the use of Female Dialect, and the assumption of female names, the Maiden Name tradition: the controversial figure of Charles Hitchen (alternative spelling: Hitchin), member of the Society for the Reformation of Manners, notable thief-taker, former Under City Marshal in London, was described as a regular in molly-houses according to a libel written by Jonathan Wild and also to be referred by using female names.

the Marshal was complimented by the Company with the Titles of Madam and Ladyship.

From James Dalton's A Genuine Narrative of all the Street Robberies Committed since October last:

Their chief Names are as follows. Ellinor Roden, China Mary, Flying Horse Moll, Smal Coal Mary, Johannah the Ox-cheek Woman, Tub Nan,' Sukey Pisquill, Garter Mary, Hardward Nan, Prety Criss, a Soldier of the 2d Regiment, Aunt England, a noted Soap Boyler, Pomegranate Molly, Orange Mary, an Orange Merchant near London-Bridge,'Old Fish Hannah,'Kate Hutton an old Man that never wears a Shirt, Thumbs and Waste Jenny, Queen Irons, alias Pippin Mary, Hanover Kate, spouse to Pippin Mary, Miss Kitten (Oviat), Rose Gudger, 'Black Moll, &c.

They could take on a female persona, have a female name, and affect feminine mannerisms and speech. Again from Jonathan Wild:

The men calling one another my Dear, and hugging, kissing, and tickling each other, as if they were a Mixture of wanton Males and Females, and assuming effeminate Voices and Airs

- Cross-dressing, from Jonathan Wild:
  At the expected Time several of the sporting Youngsters were seized in Women's Apparel, and convey'd to the Compter. Next Morning they were carried before the Lord-Mayor in the same Dress they were taken in. Some were compleatly rigg'd in Gowns, Petticoats, Head-cloths, fine lac'd Shoes, furbelow'd Scarves and Marks; some had Riding-hoods; some were dressed like Milk-Maids, others like Shepheardesses with green Hats, Waistcoats and Petticoats; and others had their Faces patch'd and painted, and wore very extensive Hoop-petticoats, which had been very lately introduced.
- Marriage ceremonies: often a euphemism for sexual intercourse but sometimes actual ceremonies between a Mollie and his male lover, enacted to symbolise their partnership and commitment to each other.
- "Mock-birth" rituals: during which a man dressed in a nightgown pretended to be a woman giving birth to a baby assisted by fellow Mollies as "midwives" – a fact confirmed by other sources including trials. This ritual almost certainly originated as a couvade, designated to collectively relieve the extreme stress this particular social group was forced to live under. The ceremonies described by Ned Ward took place in specific periods called "Festival Nights", which other sources indicate took place towards the end of December.

=== Mother Clap's molly-house ===
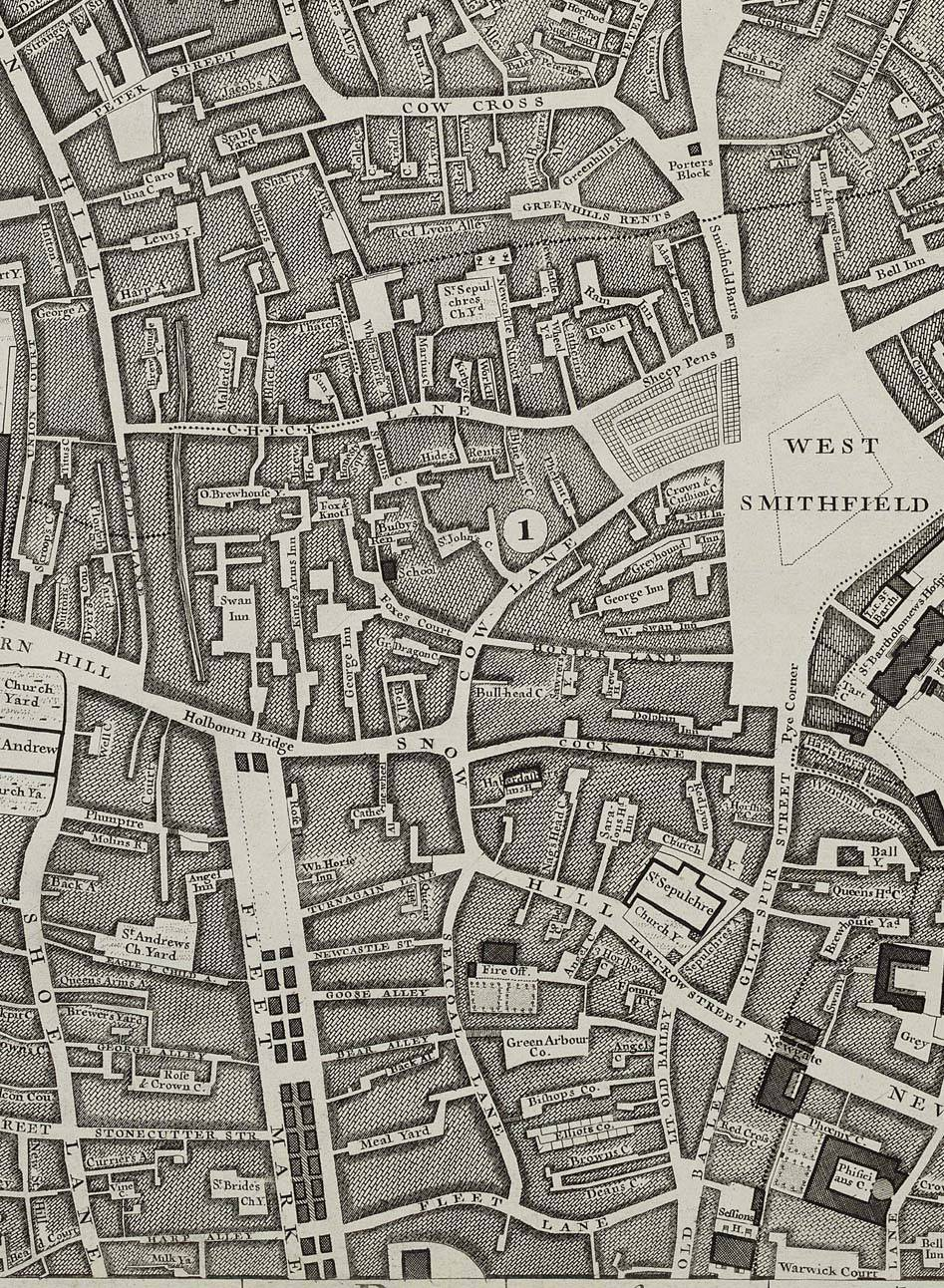
Field Lane, Holborn, the location of Mother Clap's molly-house on the left side of the picture, Rocque Map of London, 1746

The most well known molly-house in 18th century London was that owned by Mother Clap, which had been open from 1724 to 1726, when a raid sustained by the Societies for the Reformation of Manners had it dismantled and 40 gay men who were present at the molly-house at the time of the raid were taken to Newgate prison where most were eventually set free and the rest were either fined, imprisoned, exhibited in the pillory and three were hanged. It was located in Field Lane, near to another tavern The Bunch of Grapes in Holborn, a suburban parish of Middlesex a short distance from the City of London. This area came to be renowned as a rookery in the next decades, and described as "a sort of distinct town, or district calculated for the reception of the darkest and most dangerous enemies to society; in which when pursued for the commission of crimes they easily conceal themselves and readily escape". A literary example can be interpreted as a sort of confirmation of the reputation of this lane, since Charles Dickens placed here Fagin's den, an old Jewish man earning a living as a fence, in his 1837 novel Oliver Twist.
This homosexual meeting place, however, became well known to the public during the 1720s through the trial of its keeper, Margaret Clap, indicted for keeping a disorderly house and for encouraging her customers to commit sodomy; and, particularly, through the account given by an agent provocateur, Samuel Stevens.

On Sunday Night the 14th of November. I went to the Prisoners House in Field-Lane, Holbourn. I found near Men Fifty there, making Love to one another as they call'd it. Sometimes they'd sit in one anothers Laps, use their Hands indecently Dance and make Curtsies and mimick the Language of Women – O Sir! - Pray Sir! - Dear Sir! Lord how can ye serve me so! – Ah ye little dear Toad! Then they'd go by Couples, into a Room on the same Floor to be marry'd as they call'd it. The Door at that Room was kept by – Ecclestone to prevent any body from balking their Diversions.

She and half a dozen of her customers were also put into the pillory, fined, and imprisoned for periods of up to two years. Three of her customers were hanged for sodomy: Gabriel Lawrence, a 43-year-old milkman; William Griffin, a 43-year-old furniture upholsterer; and Thomas Wright, who was a molly house keeper.

=== Trials and personalities related to molly-houses ===
In the eighteenth century, according to the Old Bailey Proceedings, only two individuals were formally arrested for keeping a molly-house: Margaret Clap and Julius Cesar Taylor, but several accused of sodomitical practices seems to be reported as brothel keepers as well (i.e. Thomas Wright).

On 9 May 1726, three men (Gabriel Lawrence, William Griffin, and Thomas Wright) were hanged at Tyburn for buggery following a raid of Margaret Clap's molly-house. Their trials are fundamental since they provide important details for the descriptions of the gay community surroundings. On 12 April 1727 Charles Hitchin was convicted of assault with sodomitical intent.

== In popular culture ==
References and representations of molly-houses and gay subculture during the 18th and the 19th century London can be found in several contemporary productions.

Film

- 2022: The short film Tommies by filmmakers Brian Fairbairn and Karl Eccleston explores the fallout of the Vere Street Coterie scandal from the perspective of the wives of the men involved.

Novel

- 2003: Lord John and the Private Matter by Diana Gabaldon

TV series

- 2008: Episode 2 of the Channel 4 series City of Vice grants molly-house and mollies a predominant role
- 2010: Episode 2 of the second series of Garrow's Law, a BBC production set in and around London's Old Bailey courthouse, depicts legal issues surrounding gay life in the 18th century, including a molly-house in its settings
- 2017: A molly-house and related characters feature heavily in Taboo
- 2018: Several molly-houses (referred to as boy brothels within the series) and multiple characters are one focal point of The Alienist set in 1896 New York City
- 2019: A molly-house and mollies appear throughout season 3 of the Hulu series Harlots

Theatre

- 2001: Mark Ravenhill's Mother Clap's Molly House play, based on Rictor Norton's book, Mother Clap's Molly House: The Gay Subculture of England, 1700–1830, is entirely dedicated to the famous 18th-century molly-house and its regulars

Gaming

- 2024: Molly House from Wehrlegig Games, a board game with player characters attending a molly-house

== See also ==
- Cottaging
- Gay cruising in England and Wales
- LGBTQ culture in London
