= The First Domino =

Play by Jonathan Cash

- Original language: English
- Written by: Jonathan Cash

Premiere
- Date: 19 May 2009
- Place: United Kingdom

The First Domino is a 2009 English play about a fictional terrorist bomber, written by Jonathan Cash, who was injured in the 1999 bombing of the Admiral Duncan pub in Soho, London by David Copeland.

In 1999, Cash was standing in the pub when the third and final nail-bomb exploded in a campaign targeting minorities. He received compensation, and used it to fund a university course in Dramatic Writing. Some years later, he developed a two-hander play about a convicted terrorist being interviewed in prison by a psychiatrist. It premièred at the Brighton Festival Fringe in May 2009, and received the Best Theatrical Performance Award. It was later adapted for radio.

In 2011, comparisons were drawn between the terror campaign, the play, and the attacks in Norway.

== Background ==
Photograph showing Cash, injured, moments after the bomb exploded.

The First Domino play takes its name from the domino effect, and was written as a response to a real-world nail bomb attack.

In 1999, David Copeland, a Neo-Nazi and former member of the British National Party, who was found to have decorated his bedroom with Nazi symbols and collected news stories on racist attacks, intended to stir up ethnic and homophobic tension with a series of bombs targeting the minority communities of London. The first attack was in the largely black community of Brixton on Saturday, 17 April 1999. The second hit the Asian community of Brick Lane on Saturday, 24 April 1999. The third took place at a pub in Old Compton Street, Soho – the heart of London's gay community.

On Friday 30 April 1999, a sunny evening after work, Jonathan Cash – author of the play – had agreed to meet two friends in the Admiral Duncan, as was usual for them. While he waited, patrons noticed an unattended bag. The previous two bombs had made Londoners wary; although they had been described as race-hate attacks, police had issued a warning that a gay bar could be the bomber's next target, and The Yard – another pub in the area – had displayed a poster warning customers to be alert. The Admiral Duncan bomb, a home made device of fertiliser and nails, exploded at 6:37 p.m.

It was the loudest, most alien noise I have ever heard. It ripped through the building. I really can't say how long it lasted; a few seconds perhaps. I can't remember, but there was a crunch of something solid, something structural. But what I can remember is the acrid smell, the sulphurous dust. My ears were ringing, my eyes were smarting, the dust filled my nose making it hard to breathe.

— Jonathan Cash, Pink News

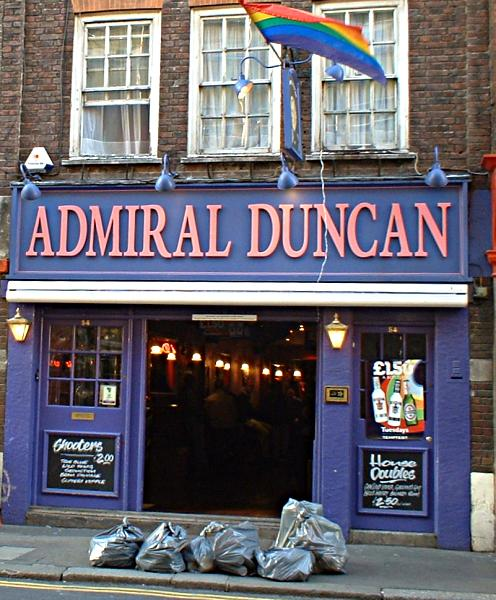
The Soho gay bar where the final bombing occurred

Three people died as a result of the blast (including a pregnant woman) and many more were seriously hurt, including Cash, who was standing close to the bomb; he received injuries to his back and shoulder, and burns to his face and legs.

David Copeland was convicted of murder on 30 June 2000, and given six concurrent life sentences. He had been diagnosed by five psychiatrists as having paranoid schizophrenia. In 2007, the High Court ruled that he must serve at least 50 years.

Cash received financial compensation, and used it to fund an MA in Dramatic Writing at the University of Sussex, saying he "wanted to do something positive with the money".

Cash perceived Copeland as wanting to be the first domino, setting off a race war.

== Plot ==
The opening scene shows a young man kneeling on a Union Jack, manufacturing a bomb, which is left menacingly on the stage. We meet him some time later, in a top-security prison, convicted for terrorism. He is interviewed by a psychiatrist who is engaged in research on sociopaths for an academic paper. The bomber's belief system, incorporating violent racism and homophobia, is revealed – causing the audience to question their own beliefs. A series of psychological games starts between the prisoner and the psychiatrist, which challenges the audience's conceptions. Secrets are gradually revealed, reality is distorted, and the play ends with a surprising twist. It is a play about hatred, which illustrates how violence breeds more violence. The complex relationship between bomber and psychiatrist fails to result in a solution.

== Reception ==
A preview in The Guardian in May 2009 said it had "surprising twists [...] as the plot thickens", and one reviewer said it was "one of the most honest and hard hitting plays I have seen". The play received that year's Best Theatrical Performance Award.

A representative of the Gay Police Association hoped the play would raise awareness; the GPA helped to raise money for producing it, and recollections from the police influenced the story.

== Development ==
It was several years after the bombing before Cash was able to write about the events with objectivity. He wrote The First Domino as part of his M.A. Dramatic Writing course at the University of Sussex, where he met Faynia Williams, who encouraged the development and directed the production.

The play was produced by the Brighton Theatre and directed by Williams. It was a two-hander about a fictional terrorist being interviewed by a psychiatrist in a top-security prison. Danny Seldon (who used to be a marine) played the part of the terrorist, the doctor was played by Cary Crankson, and music was by Rory Cameron. with "surprising twists".

Cash and Williams's production company, Brighton Theatre, presented the play at Brighton Festival Fringe on 19 May 2009, close to the 10th anniversary of the bombing (though they state the date was coincidental). It was described as "honest and hard-hitting".

Cash was then commissioned by production company Unique (part of UBC Media Group) to rewrite the play for BBC Radio 3's series of single dramas The Wire. The completely re-imagined piece was first broadcast on Saturday, 9 October 2010. The cast list included Toby Jones, Joseph Kloska, Claire Price and Struan Rodger.

Less than a year later, Cash was quoted in The Guardian in a piece reacting to the 2011 Norway attacks as conclusions were reached about the similarities between David Copeland and Anders Behring Breivik. Cash said, "It has made me think about the words people use. How they create a landscape. When someone is being bigoted or homophobic, everybody should be asking questions".
