= Old Compton Street =

Street in the West End of London

Coordinates: 51.51326°N 0.13128°W

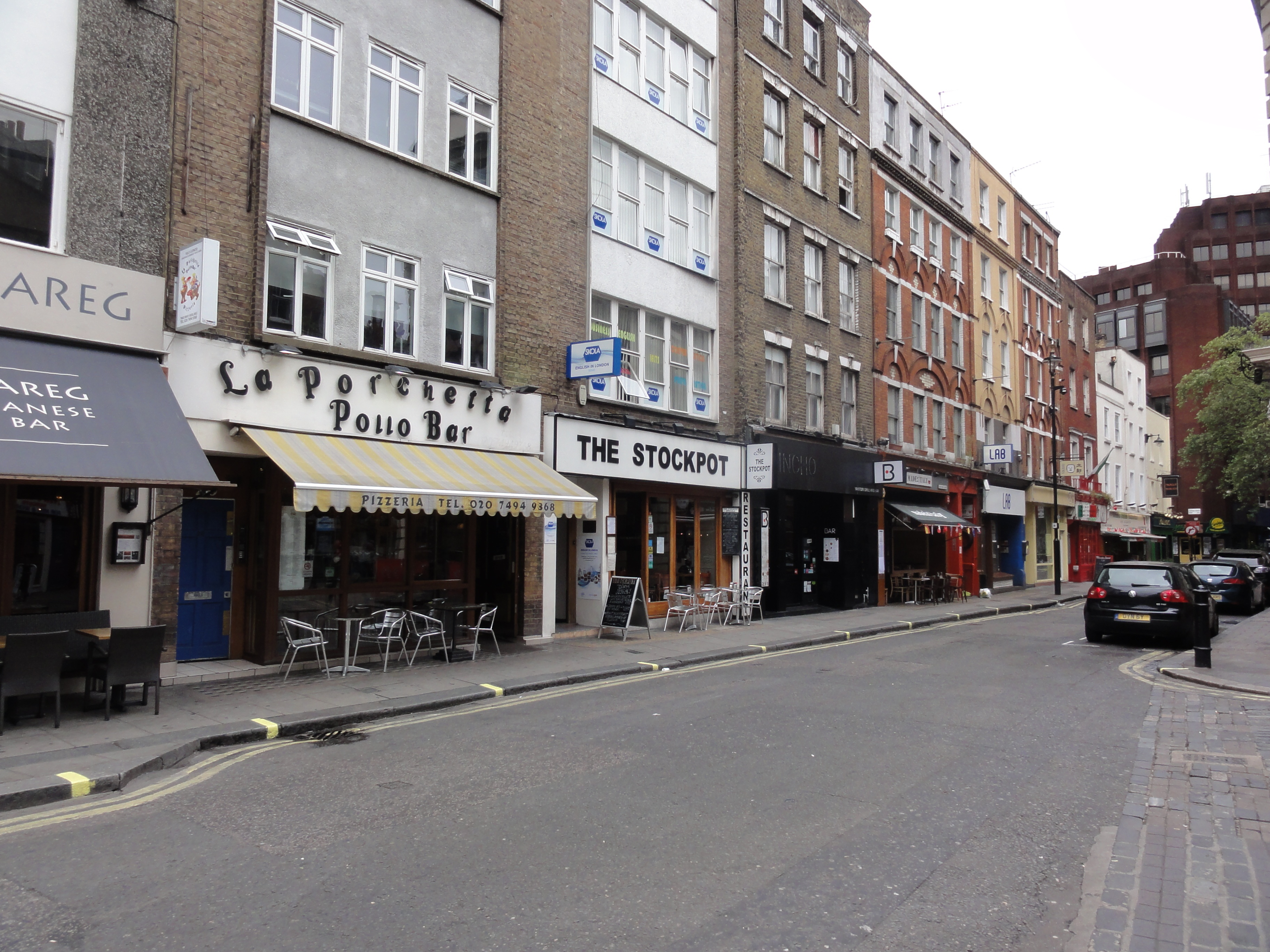
Eastern end of Old Compton Street

Old Compton Street is a road that runs east–west through Soho in the West End of London, named after Henry Compton who raised funds for St Anne's Church in 1686. The area, particularly this street, became home to French Protestant refugees in 1681. Known for its diverse and artistic traditions, the street housed businesses, artists, philosophers, and was frequented by communists and proto-beatniks. The Algerian Coffee Stores, one of the oldest shops on the street, was established in 1887. After World War II, the street became a centre for modern and trad jazz. Since the 1970s, Old Compton Street has been a focal point for London's gay community, with numerous gay bars, restaurants, and specialty shops. The Admiral Duncan pub, a notable gay venue, was bombed in 1999 in a hate crime attack. The street is also home to the Prince Edward Theatre.

== History ==
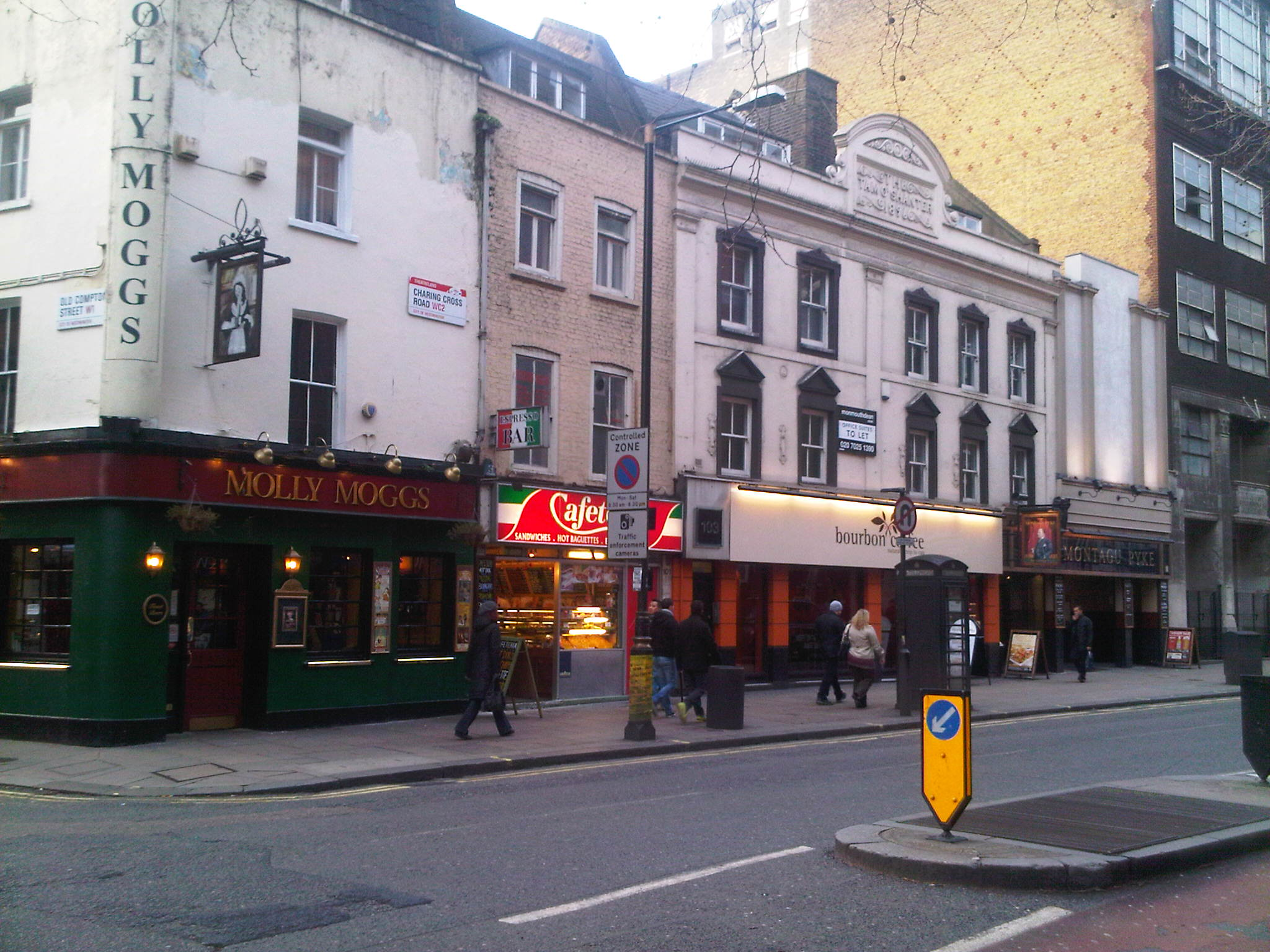
Charing Cross Road at the junction with Old Compton Street, with traffic island and grate through which a Little Compton Street sign is visible

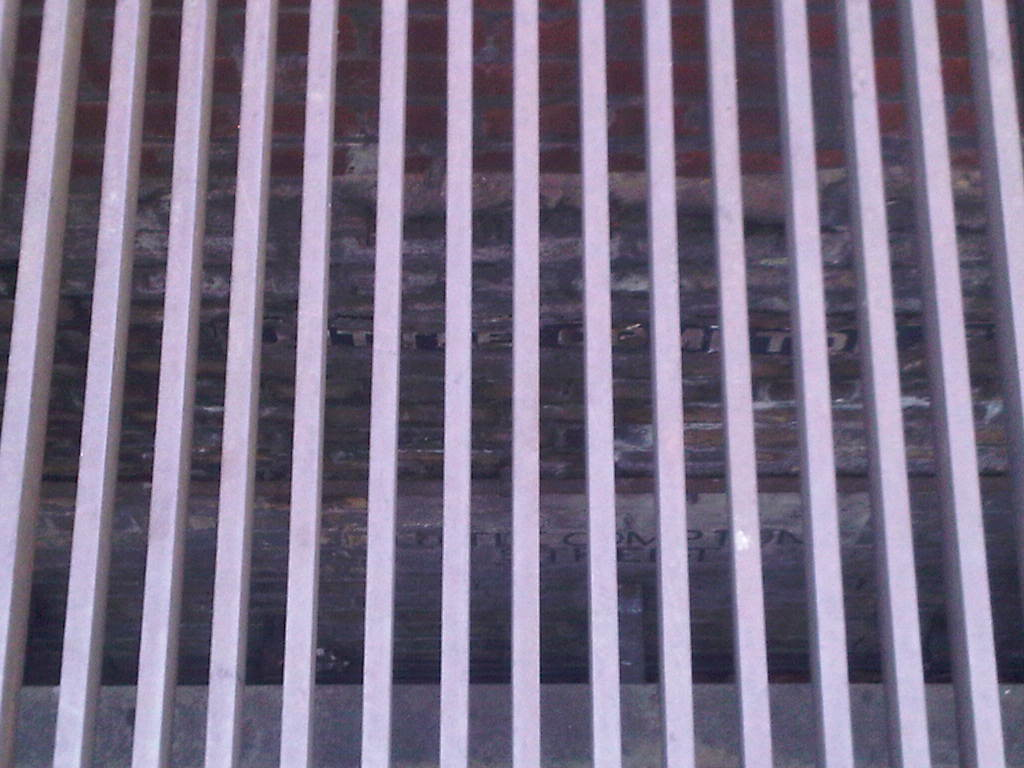
Little Compton Street sign visible in a utility tunnel

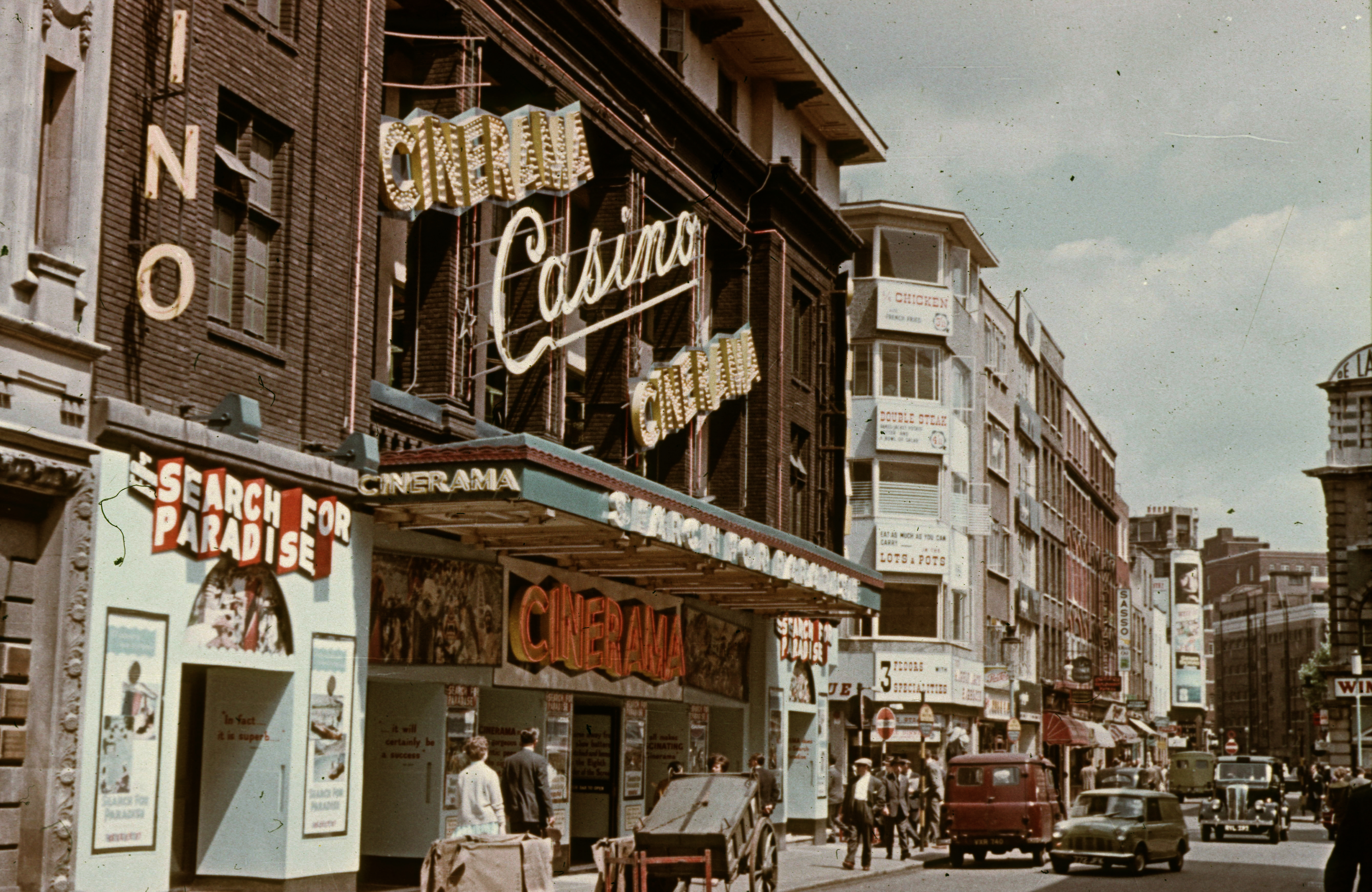
The street in 1960, showing the Prince Edward Theatre while it was operating as the Casino Cinema

The street was named after Henry Compton who raised funds for a local parish church, eventually dedicated as St Anne's Church in 1686. The area in general and this street, in particular, became the home of Huguenots, French Protestant refugees who were given asylum in England by Charles II in 1681.

The street was known simply as Compton Street until being renamed to Old Compton Street in 1896. By the end of the eighteenth century and until that renaming, the east end of the street between Greek Street and Charing Cross Road (at the time, Crown Street) was known as Little Compton Street. A street sign for Little Compton Street remains on the wall of a utility tunnel that runs beneath Charing Cross Road, and is visible through a street grate on a traffic island.

By the end of the 18th century, fewer than ten of the houses were without shop fronts. An 1818 trade directory shows that the businesses occupying premises in the street included several watch and clock makers, a bookseller, a straw hat maker, a surgeon and accoucheur, an undertaker, a mathematical instrument maker, a bedding warehouse, several grocers and two "dealers in curiosities".

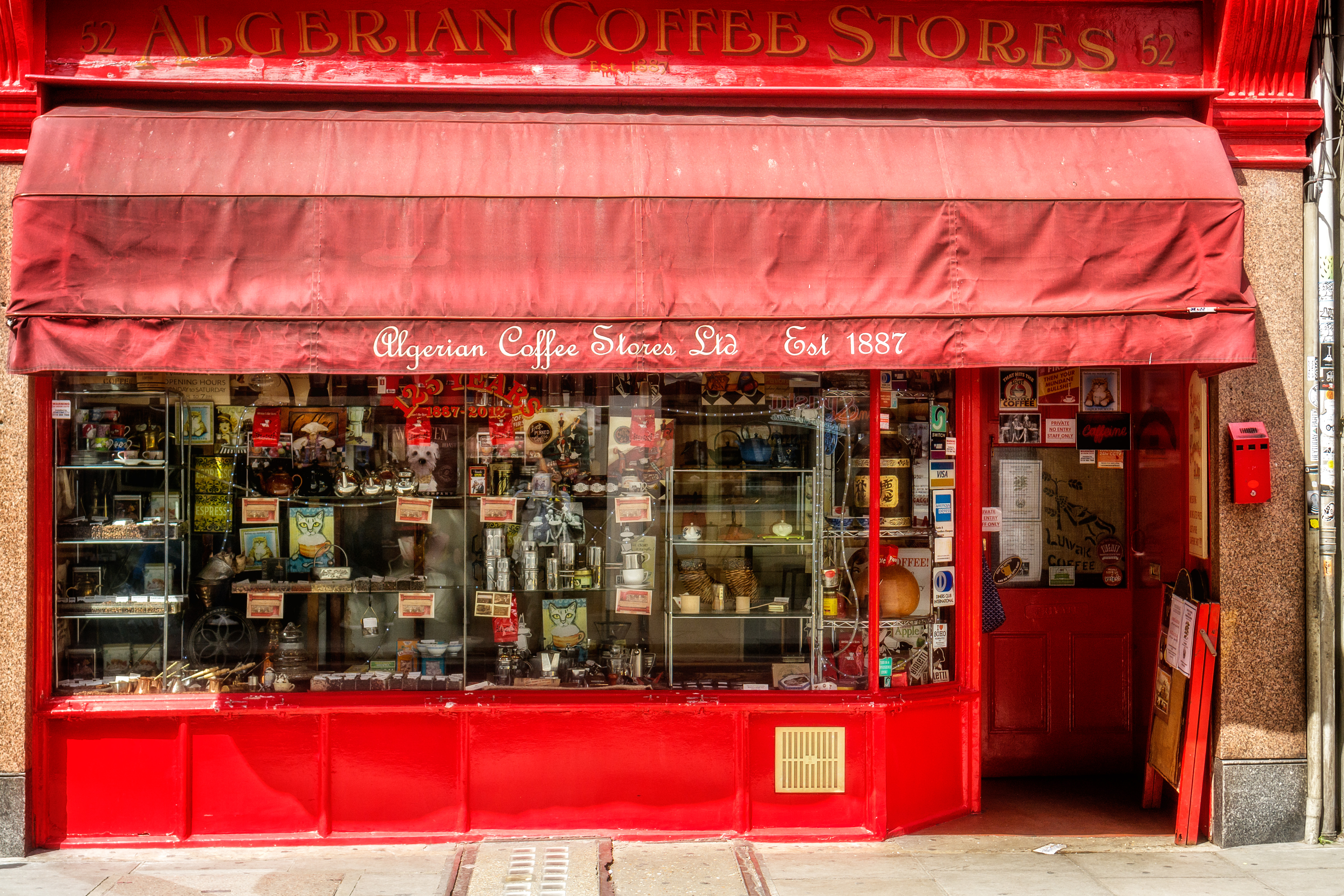
The Algerian Coffee Stores in 2015

In the middle of the 19th century, while there were some workshops too, as well as restaurants and public houses, the ground floors of most of the houses were still used as shops. The number of people of overseas descent continued to grow and the street became a meeting place for exiles, particularly those from France: after the suppression of the Paris Commune, the poets Arthur Rimbaud and Paul Verlaine often frequented drinking haunts here. Richard Wagner also spent time living on the street: more generally it became a home for artists, philosophers, bohemians and composers. In 1887, M. Siari, an Algerian, established the Algerian Coffee Stores at number 52, still known as among the world's best leading suppliers of tea and coffee, which remains up to now one of the oldest shops in the street.

The street's radical and artistic traditions continued after World War II, with it being frequented by communists, proto-beatniks and existentialists, and it became a centre for modern and trad jazz.

Between 1956 and 1970 the 2i's Coffee Bar was located at number 59. Many well-known 1960s pop musicians played in its cramped surroundings.

== Current ==
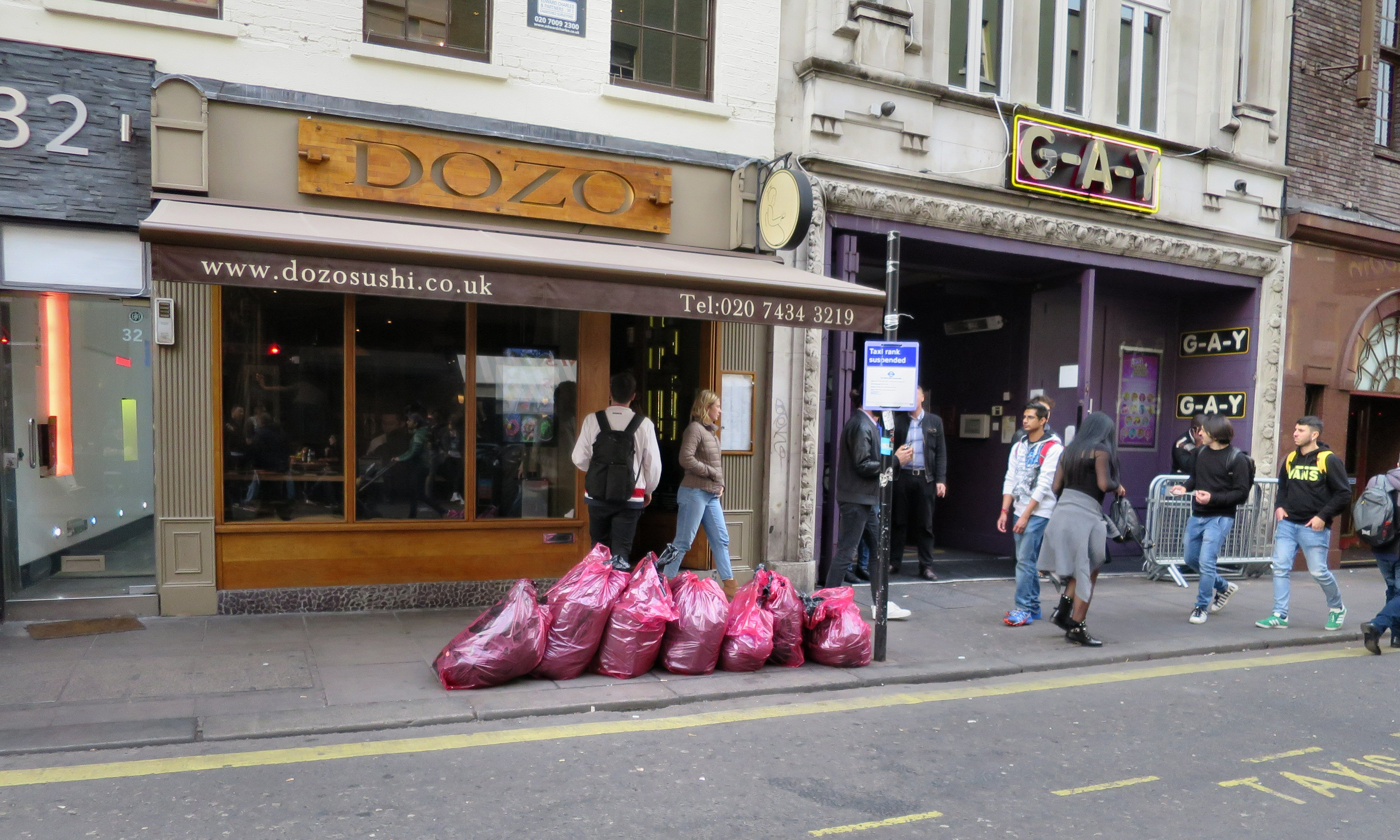
Part of the north side Old Compton Street in 2019, showing numbers 32 and 30 - the G-A-Y Bar

Since the 1970s, the street has become a focal point for London's lesbian, gay, bisexual and transgender community. It features several gay bars, gay-friendly restaurants, cafés and specialist gay shops. Whilst a pedestrianisation project proved unpopular with local traders and was reversed, the street is closed to vehicular traffic for the Soho Pride festival one weekend each year, usually in late summer. The Prince Edward Theatre is located at the eastern end of the street. Until 2004 the long-running production of Mamma Mia!, a musical based upon the songs of ABBA, was showing at the theatre. When Mamma Mia! moved to larger premises in another part of the West End, a production of Mary Poppins moved in, but closed in 2008. It subsequently became home to Aladdin and in 2019 a revival of Mary Poppins. London producer and director Adam Spreadbury-Maher lives at the northern end of Old Compton Street.

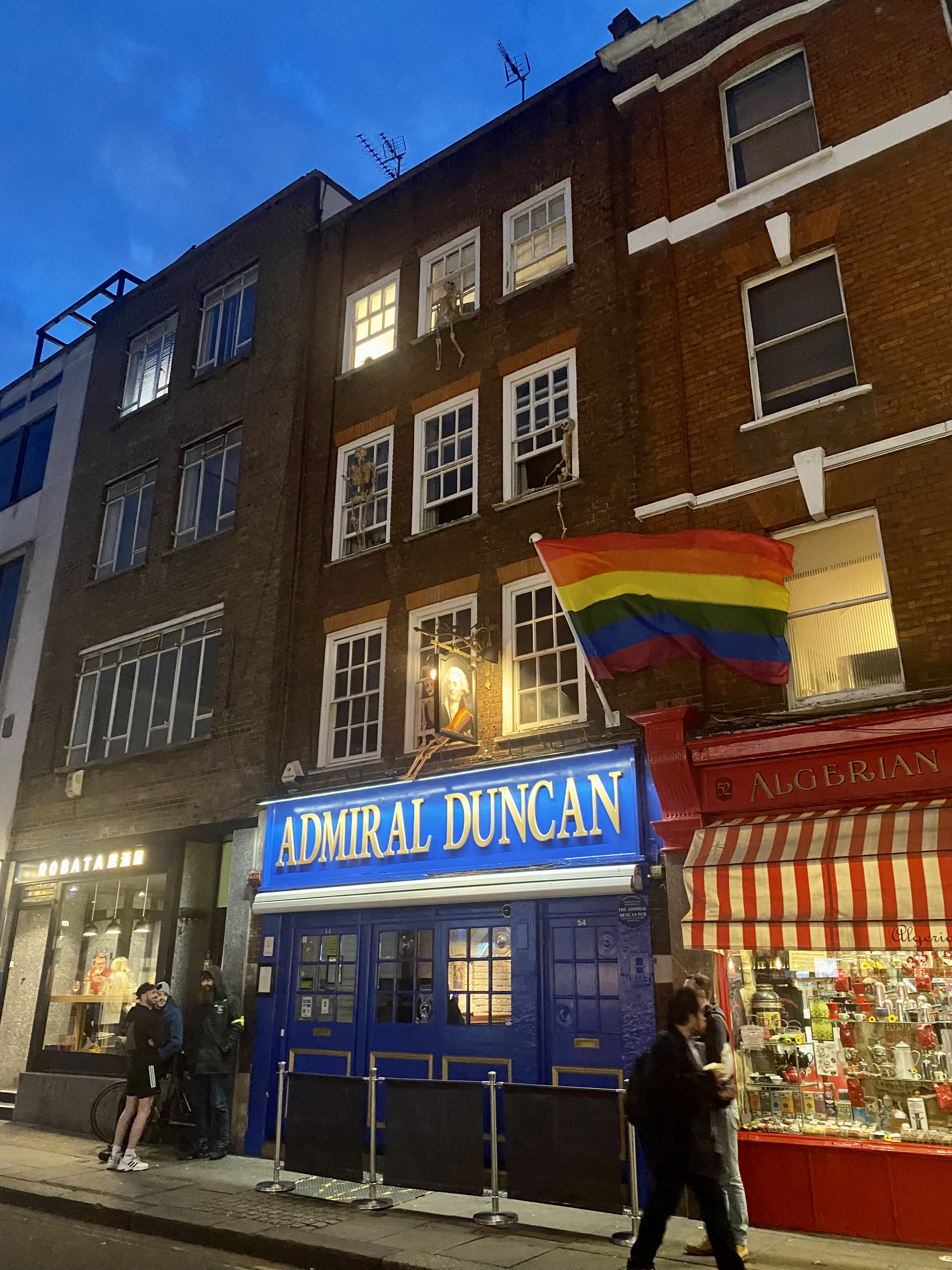
The Admiral Duncan public house, 2021

In 1999, the Admiral Duncan pub, a well-known gay venue, was the site of a terrorist nail bomb attack which killed three people and injured over a dozen. A neo-nazi, David Copeland, was subsequently found guilty of the bombing (intended specifically to injure members of the gay community). Previously decorated in neutral colours, Admiral Duncan was re-opened following the attack with a flamboyant pink and purple exterior with a large rainbow flag flying outside as a symbol of gay pride.

Along the street are various other gay bars including Comptons of Soho. Also on the street are a variety of cafés, tea rooms (including the original cafe that gave its name to the Patisserie Valerie chain), restaurants including Bincho, a yakitori restaurant, Balans (use to be known for being open 24 hours a day), and specialist sex shops.

Recent years have seen debate over the changing character of the street amid wider changes in London's nightlife economy. In October 2025, the owner of G-A-Y closed the bar and argued that the street had lost its 'LGBT identity' over the preceding years: 'Old Compton Street wasn't just a street, it was a community together as one. But sadly that's not Old Compton Street anymore.'

== Additional adjoining streets ==
- Wardour Street
- Greek Street
- New Compton Street
