= BFI Flare: London LGBTIQ+ Film Festival =

LGBTQ film festival in England

Coordinates: 51.5072°N 0.1157°W

BFI Flare: London LGBTQIA+ Film Festival
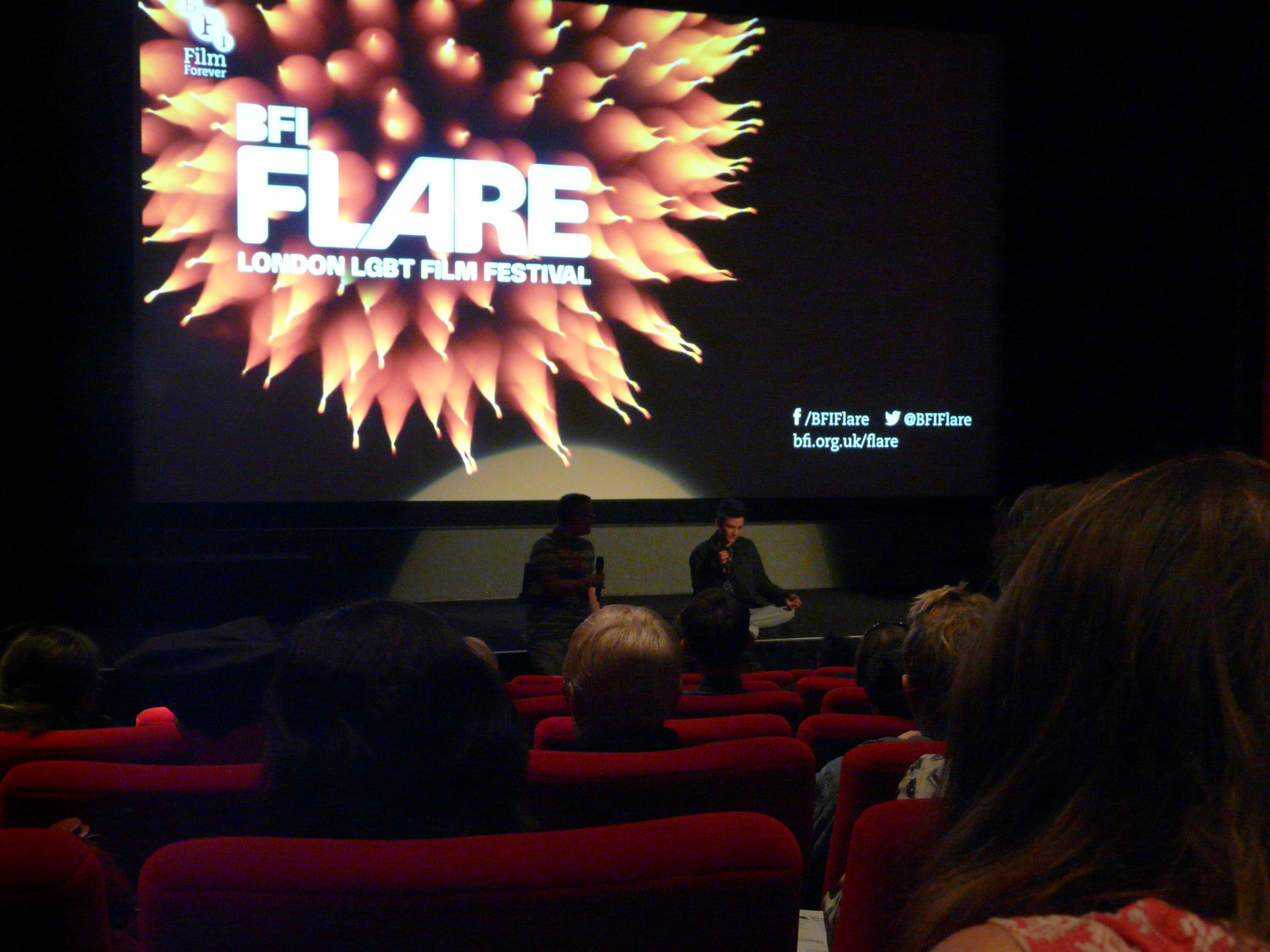
- A screening at the 2014 event
- Location: London, United Kingdom
- Founded: 1986
- Most recent: 2026
- Language: International
- Website: whatson.bfi.org.uk/flare/

Current: 39th
- 39th 38th

BFI Flare: London LGBTQIA+ Film Festival, formerly known as the London Lesbian and Gay Film Festival (LLGFF), is the biggest LGBTIQ+ film festival in Europe. It takes place every spring in London, in the United Kingdom. Organised and run by the British Film Institute, all BFI Flare screenings take place in the BFI Southbank.

== History ==
It began in 1986 as a season of films at the National Film Theatre for two years under the title "Gay's Own Pictures", featuring films selected by Peter Packer of the Tyneside Cinema. In 1988 it was renamed the 'London Lesbian and Gay Film Festival'. Having been a two-week festival for many years, the festival was shortened to a week in 2011, then increased to 10 days in 2012. The event's name was changed to BFI Flare in 2014.

On its 30th anniversary screenings attendance at BFI Flare was up 9% and box-office results surpassed the previous, record-breaking year. Audiences at all events and screenings over the eleven-day festival totalled 25,623 in 2016. Additional programming under the BFI Flare tag is available throughout the year.

The 38th edition of BFI Flare took place at the BFI Southbank from 13 to 24 March 2024. It featured 33 world premieres across its programme, divided into three thematic strands called Hearts, Bodies, and Minds.

The 39th edition of BFI Flare took place from 19 to 30 March 2025. BFI Flare’s 39th edition opened with The Wedding Banquet, a modern reimagining of Ang Lee’s 1993 film.

== See also ==
- List of LGBT events
- List of LGBT film festivals
- LGBT culture in London
