= Admiral Duncan (pub) =

Gay pub in Soho, Westminster, London, England

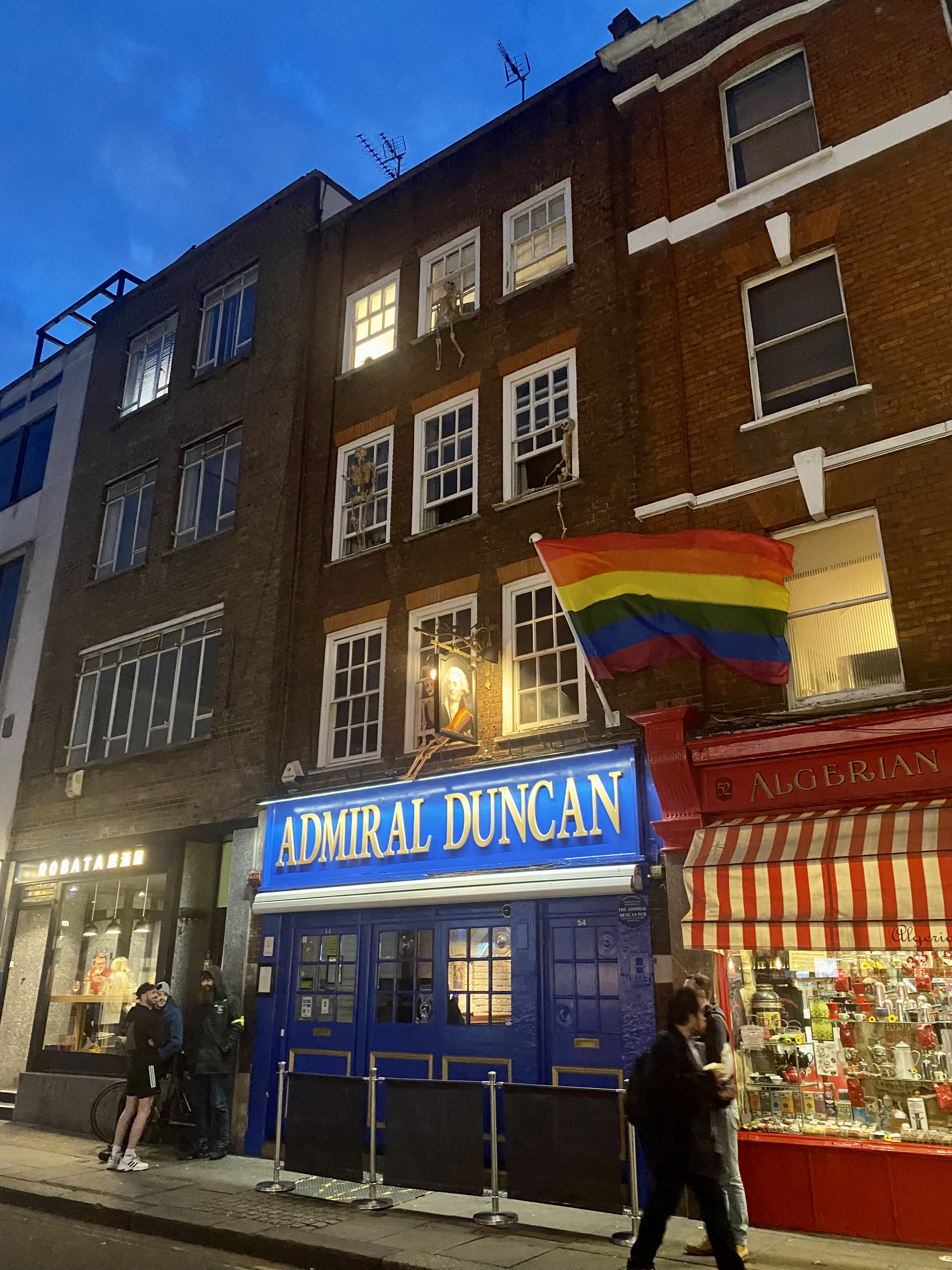
- The Admiral Duncan in 2021
- Etymology: Admiral Adam Duncan

General information
- Location: Soho, London, 54 Old Compton Street, London, W1
- Coordinates: 51°30′46″N 0°07′57″W
- Owner: Stonegate Pub Company

Website
- https://www.admiral-duncan.co.uk/

The Admiral Duncan is a public house in Old Compton Street, Soho, Westminster that is well known as one of Soho's oldest gay pubs.

In 1999, the pub was bombed by neo-Nazi David Copeland, resulting in three people being killed and 83 being injured.

== Etymology ==
The pub is named after British Admiral Adam Duncan, who defeated the Batavian Navy at the Battle of Camperdown in 1797.

== History ==
=== Early years ===
The Admiral Duncan has been trading since at least 1832.

In June of that year, Dennis Collins, a wooden-legged Irish ex-sailor living at the pub, was charged with high treason for throwing stones at King William IV at Ascot Racecourse. Collins was convicted and sentenced to be hanged, drawn and quartered, as the medieval punishment for high treason was then still in effect. However, his sentence was quickly commuted to life imprisonment and he was subsequently transported to Australia.

In December 1881, a customer received eight years' penal servitude for various offences in connection with his ejection from the Admiral Duncan public house by keeper William Gordon. In 1887, the Algerian Coffee Stores was established next door to the Admiral Duncan.

During the 1920s, the Admiral Duncan was frequented by mob boss Charles "Darby" Sabini and was a gathering place for members of his gang. On 4 February 1930 there was a fierce brawl in the pub after six members of the Sabini gang's rivals, the Hoxton Gang, entered and attacked two of the Sabinis who were drinking there. Both men were slashed with a broken drinking glass; one – George Seawell – was badly beaten by four of the Hoxton gang. Around £200 worth of damage was caused. The fracas was broken up by police and the six Hoxton Gang members were arrested. Three of them – brothers John and Arthur Phillips, and John Daly – were later sentenced to five years, three years and 12 months in prison

It has been claimed that in 1953 Dylan Thomas lost the only hand-written copy of his famous radio drama Under Milk Wood in the pub, leaving it there during the course of a drinking binge. It was later found by his radio producer, Douglas Cleverdon, who retraced Thomas' steps. However other sources state this happened at The Swiss Tavern, another pub in Old Compton Street, or The French House in nearby Dean Street.

By the 1980s, the Admiral Duncan had become known as a gay pub, although it was not exclusively so and was still attracting a diverse clientele.

=== Bombing ===
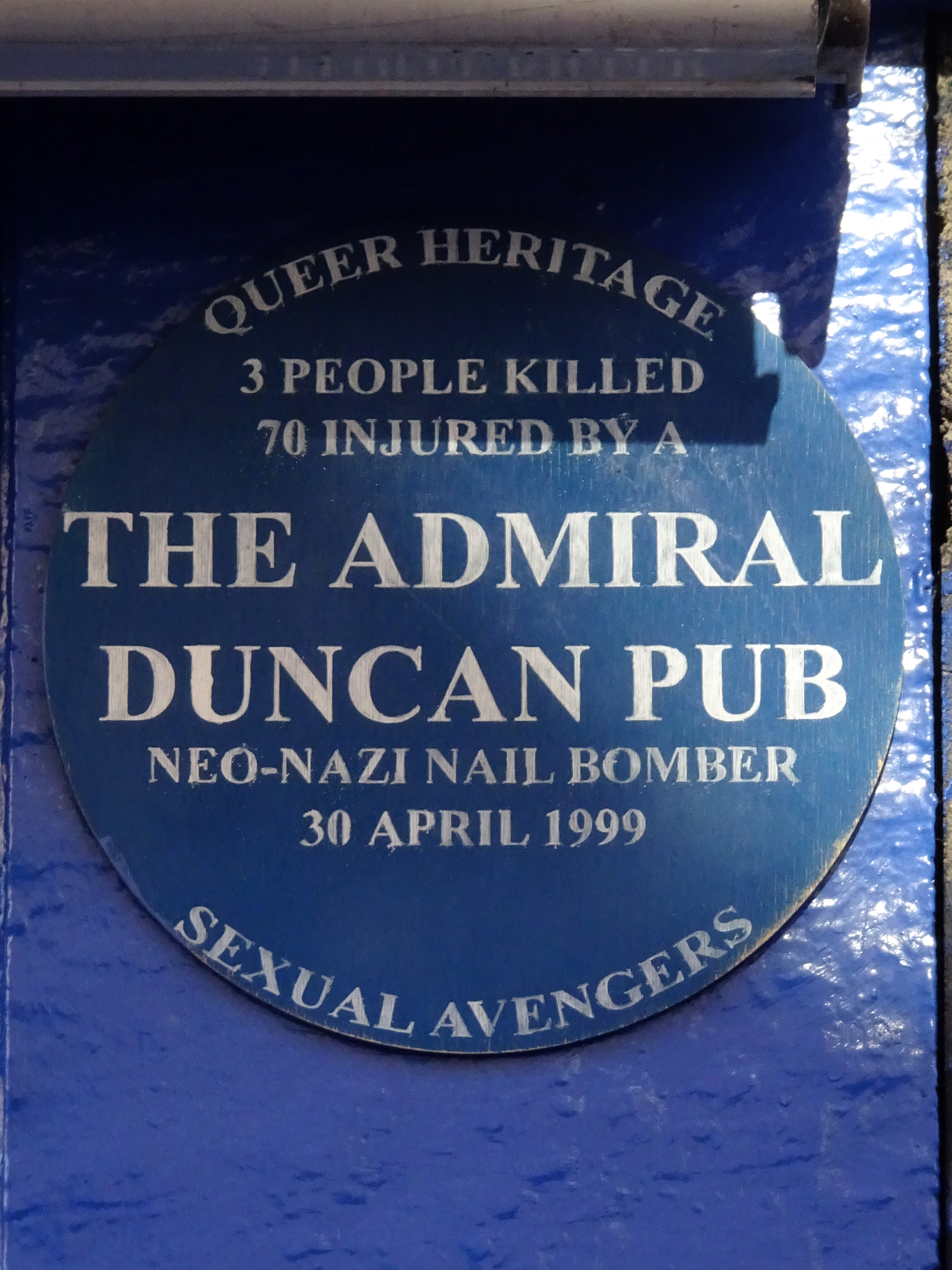
A plaque at the Admiral Duncan that commemorates the victims of the 1999 attack

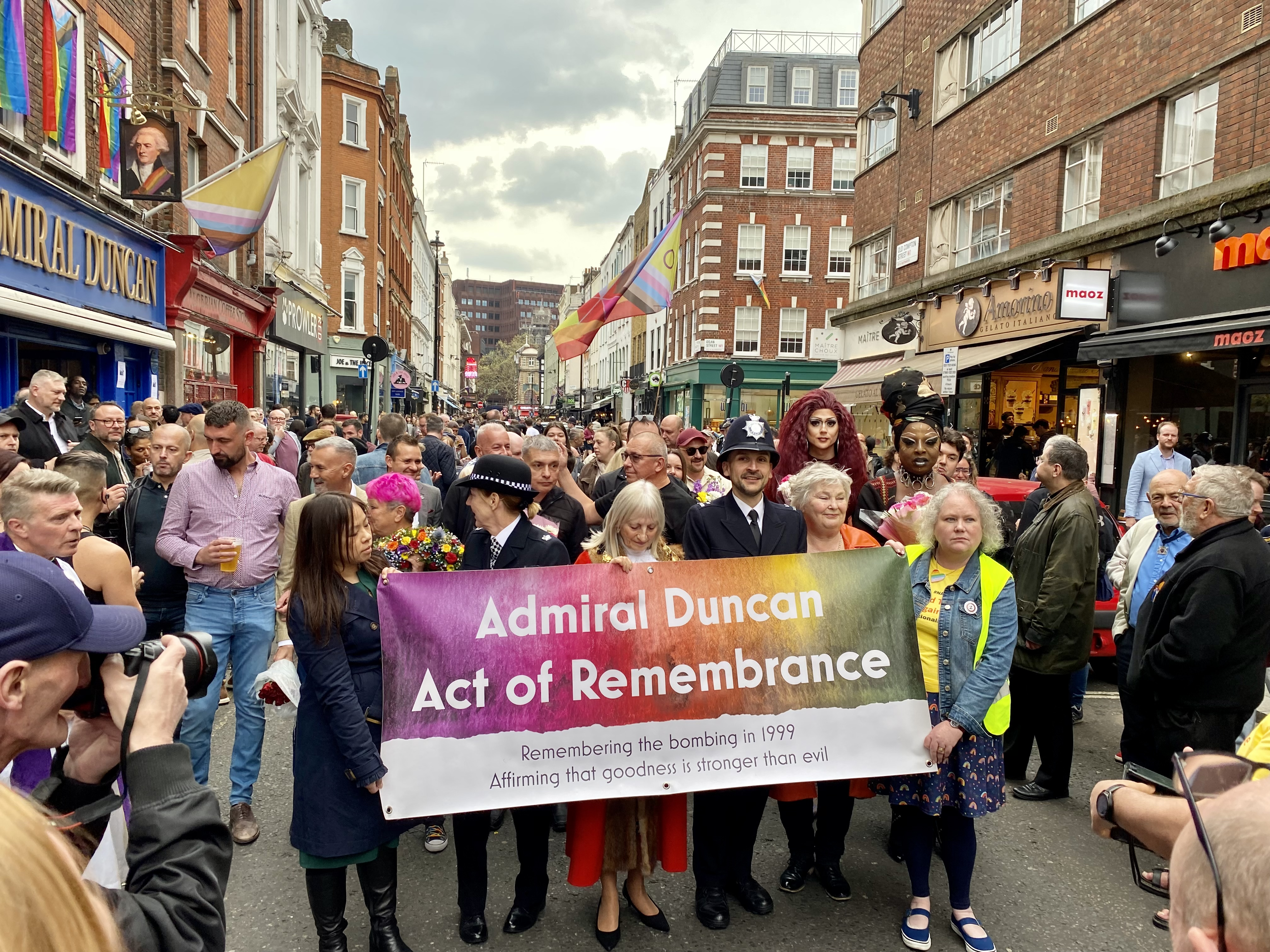
The 2023 act of remembrance marking the anniversary of the bombing

At around 6:05 pm on Friday 30 April 1999, a bomb in a sports bag was planted in the Admiral Duncan by Neo-Nazi, David Copeland. It was the third bomb he had planted in London in a one-man campaign intended to stir up ethnic and homophobic tensions.

Copeland's previous bomb attacks, on 17 April in Brixton and on 24 April in Hanbury Street in Whitechapel, had made Londoners wary. The unattended bag aroused the suspicions of people in the pub, but the bag exploded at 6:37 pm just as it was being investigated by the pub manager, Mark Taylor. Three people died and 83 suffered burns and injuries – four of the injured needed amputations.

Copeland was still in the area and was close enough to hear the explosion. Police had identified him as a suspect around an hour before he planted the bomb. He was arrested at his home later that evening.

On the evening of Saturday, 1 May 1999, a candlelit vigil was held in Sackville Park in Manchester's Gay Village in memory of the victims of the Admiral Duncan bombing. The event was organised by the Greater Manchester Lesbian & Gay Policing Initiative, an organisation active in both local and national LGBT hate crime responses. Leaflets were distributed throughout the clubs and bars to invite members of the community to attend and pay their respects. The vigil was addressed by gay activists Ian Wilmott and Paul Fairweather.

A large open air meeting was spontaneously organised in Soho Square on the Sunday following the attack, attended by thousands. Among the speeches was one from the Metropolitan Police Assistant Commissioner who undertook to maintain a crime scene van outside the pub to take witness statements and gather evidence until the perpetrator was found; the van would be staffed entirely with openly gay and lesbian police officers. This marked a turning point for the previously often tempestuous relationship between the LGBT community and the Metropolitan Police.

There is a memorial chandelier with an inscription and a plaque in the bar to commemorate those killed and injured in the blast.

The playwright Jonathan Cash, then working for Gay Times, was among the injured. He later used the experience as the basis for his play, The First Domino, about a fictional terrorist being interviewed by a psychiatrist in a top-security prison.

Assistant bar manager David Morley 37, from Chiswick, west London, was one of those injured in the bombing and was murdered in London after a robbery or homophobic attack on the morning of 30 October 2004. He and a friend were badly beaten near London's Hungerford Bridge and Waterloo station on the South Bank. In December 2005, four youths were found guilty of Morley's manslaughter. Reece Sargeant (21), Darren Case (18) and David Blenman (17), all from Kennington, South London, were sentenced to 12 years each. A fifteen-year-old girl, Chelsea O'Mahoney (aged fourteen at the time of the incident) was sentenced to an 8-year custodial sentence. The jury had returned a verdict of manslaughter as they are permitted to do.

=== Rainbow flags controversy ===
In late 2005, Westminster City Council ordered the Admiral Duncan and all other LGBT bars and gay businesses that operated in its jurisdiction, including those in Soho and Covent Garden, to remove their pride flags. The council claimed that the flags constituted advertising, which was forbidden by its local development plan, and said businesses would need to apply for advertising permits to fly the flags. Some businesses who applied to fly flags had their applications refused. Following media allegations of homophobia in the council, the I Love Soho campaign and intense pressure from the then Mayor of London, Ken Livingstone, the Council reversed its policy, allowing businesses to fly rainbow flags without applying for permission.

== Ownership ==
In 2004 the pub was bought from the Scottish & Newcastle Brewery by the Tattershall Castle Group (TCG). In 2015, it was acquired by Stonegate Pub Company as one of 53 pubs purchased from TCG.

== See also ==
- List of LGBTQ bars
- Violence against LGBTQ people
