= Algerian Coffee Stores =

Coffee shop in Old Compton Street, London

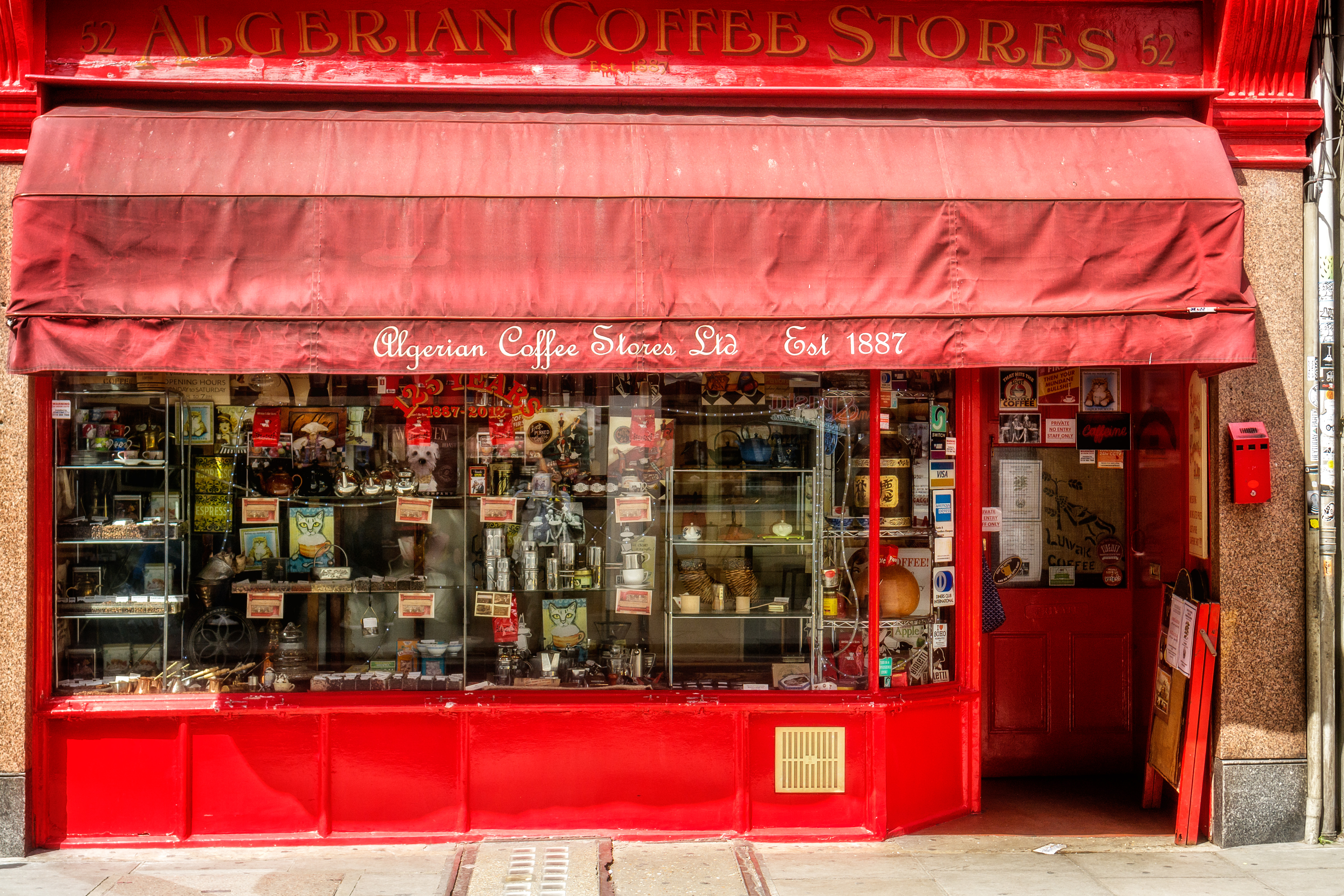
- The Algerian Coffee Stores in 2015
- Interactive map of the Algerian Coffee Stores area

General information
- Location: Soho, London, 52 Old Compton Street, London, W1
- Coordinates: 51.5129°N 0.1322°W

Website
- https://algeriancoffeestores.com/

The Algerian Coffee Stores is a coffee shop in Old Compton Street in the Soho neighborhood of London, England. Founded in 1887, it is the oldest coffee shop in London.

It was founded in 1887 by M. Siari, an Algerian, at number 52 Old Compton Street. It is still known as among the world's best leading suppliers of tea and coffee, and remains up to now one of the oldest shops in the street.

It is situated next to the famous Admiral Duncan pub, which has been trading since at least 1832.
