= Comptons of Soho =

Gay bar in Old Compton Street, London

Coordinates: 51.5126°N 0.1326°W

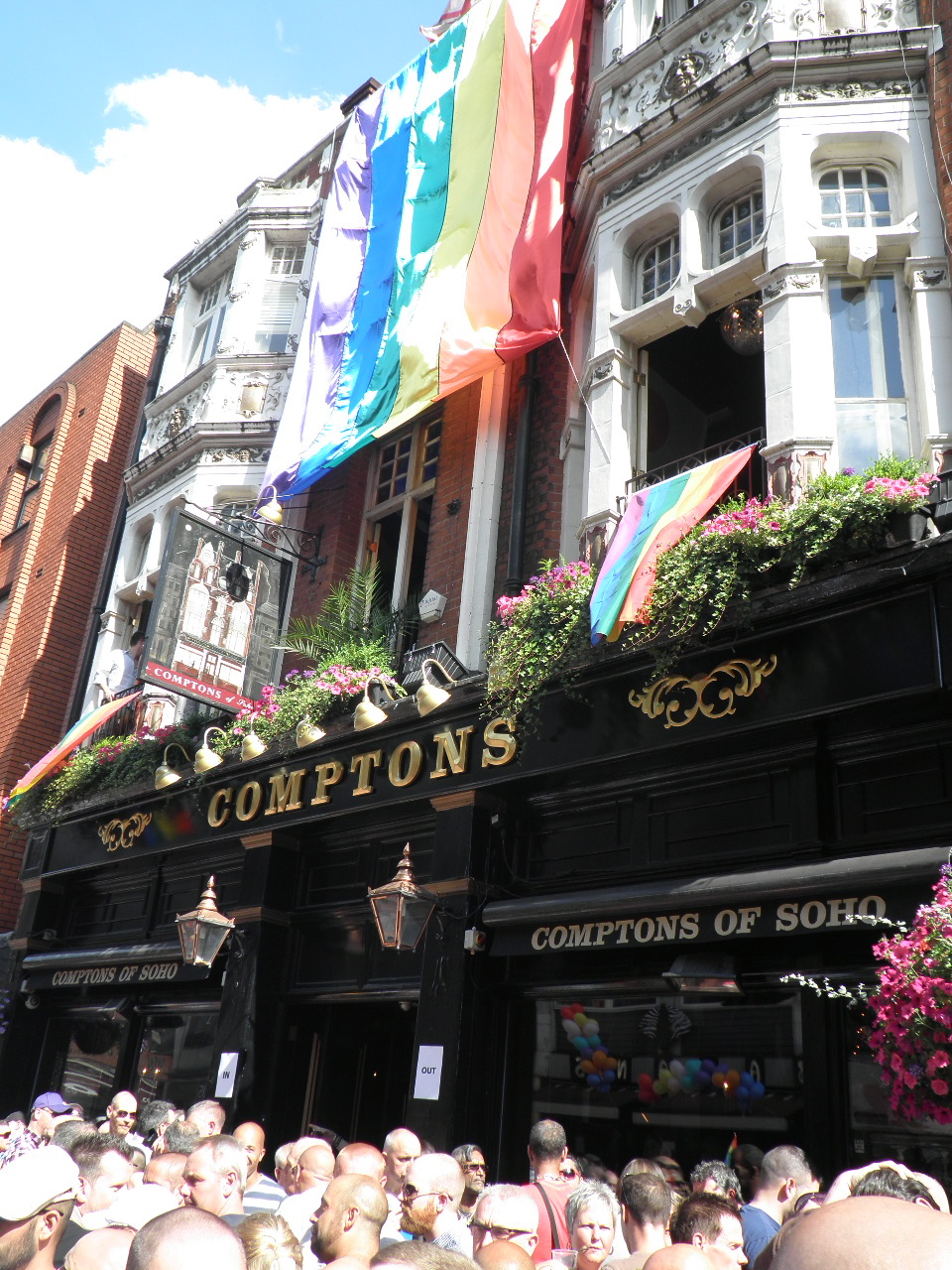
Comptons of Soho during London Gay Pride 2010

Comptons of Soho is a gay pub in London. Situated at 51–53 Old Compton Street in the heart of Soho's 'gay village', Comptons has been an integral part of London's gay scene since June 1986.

== History ==
The building was designed by architects W. A. Williams and Hopton and was built as The Swiss Hotel in 1890. Williams and Hopton exhibited their design for the Swiss Hotel in 1890 at the Royal Academy. An illustration of the original building was published in The Builder of 25 October 1890.

By the 1950s, the Swiss Hotel had been renamed "The Swiss Tavern" and was known as "not entirely straight". In 1953, the Welsh poet, Dylan Thomas, left his original manuscript of Under Milk Wood in the Swiss Tavern, where it was later recovered by his producer from the BBC. By 1986, the Swiss Tavern had been renovated and renamed "Comptons of Soho" as a gay bar. In November 2006, it celebrated its twentieth anniversary, at which time QX Magazine referred to it as "The Grand Dame of Queer Street".

Comptons is a large, Victorian-style pub with two bars. The ground floor bar is a horse-shoe bar and attracts a varied gay male crowd, including many tourists. Upstairs, there is a lounge area.

As of August 2015, it is operated by the Faucet Inn pub company.

== See also ==
- List of LGBTQ bars
