= Rictor Norton =

American historian

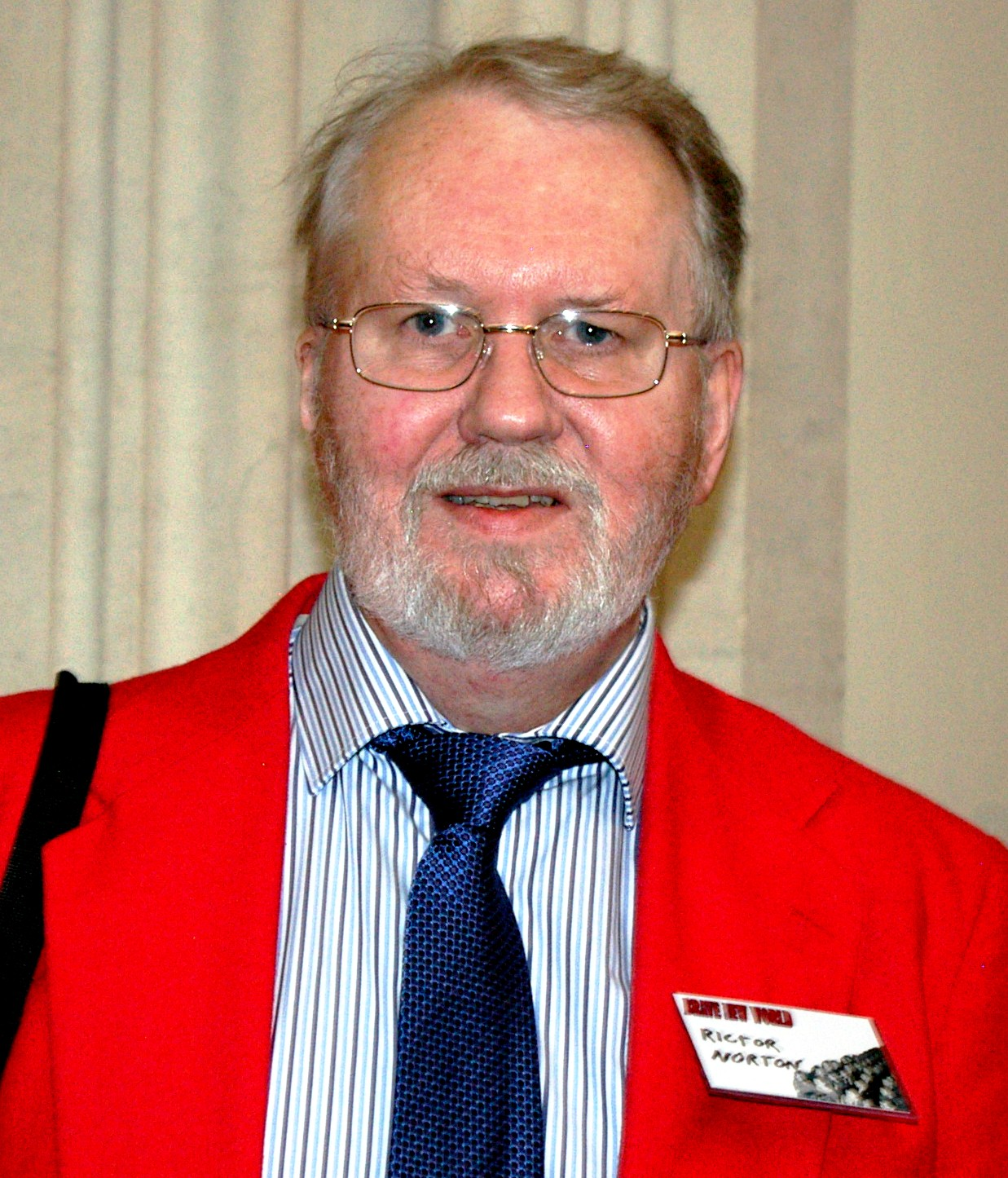
- Norton, at the London Metropolitan Archives conference in 2013.
- Born: June 25, 1945 (age 81); Friendship, New York, USA
- Education: Florida Southern College, Florida State University
- Occupation: Writer
- Years active: 1970–present
- Known for: LGBT historian

Rictor Norton (born 1945) is an American writer on literary and cultural history, particularly queer history. He is based in London, England.

== Biography ==
Norton was born in Friendship, New York, USA, on June 25, 1945. He gained a BA from Florida Southern College in 1967, and a PhD from Florida State University in 1972. His doctoral dissertation was on homosexual themes in English Renaissance literature. He worked as an instructor at Florida State University from 1970 to 1972, where he taught a course on gay and lesbian literature in 1971, one of the earliest gay courses in the United States. He was an active member of the Gay Liberation Front from 1971 to 1972, and was involved in campaigning for the repeal of Florida's sodomy statute.

In 1973, he moved to London, UK, where he has lived since, working as a journalist, publisher, researcher and freelance scholar. He worked as a research editor for the fortnightly London news journal, Gay News, from 1974 to 1978. He wrote articles on gay history and literature for publications such as Gay Sunshine and The Advocate throughout the 1970s, and for Gay Times later. In December 2005 he formed a civil partnership with his partner of nearly thirty years.

== Work ==
Norton's first book grew out of his PhD thesis on homosexuality in English Renaissance Literature. It was published as The Homosexual Literary Tradition (1974).

Norton has published academic articles in Renascence, American Imago, Yearbook of Comparative and General Literature, the London Journal, etc. He has also contributed to Sex Doctors and Sex Crimes, Who's Who in Gay & Lesbian History (Routledge, 2001) and the Oxford Dictionary of National Biography.

His work includes Mother Clap's Molly House first published in 1992 with a 2nd edition in 2006, which is a history of the molly house in England. His work also includes The Myth of the Modern Homosexual, a critique of social constructionism and the Foucaultian model of sexuality. His work My Dear Boy (1998) contains sixty sets of love letters from men to other men throughout history, from Ancient Rome to twentieth-century America.

== Publications ==
=== Books ===
- The Homosexual Literary Tradition: An Interpretation. New York: Revisionist Press, 1974.
- Mother Clap's Molly House: The Gay Subculture in England, 1700—1830. London: Gay Men's Press, 1992.
  - A second edition, revised and enlarged, was published by The Chalford Press, Stroud (an imprint of Tempus Publishing, United Kingdom) on October 10, 2006.
- The Myth of the Modern Homosexual: Queer History and the Search for Cultural Unity. London: Cassell, 1997.
- (ed.) My Dear Boy: Gay Love Letters through the Centuries. Leyland Publications, San Francisco. 1998 ISBN 0-943595-71-1
- Mistress of Udolpho: The Life of Ann Radcliffe. London: Leicester University Press, 1999
- Gothic Readings: The First Wave, 1764-1840. London: Leicester University Press, 2000.
- (ed.) Sex Doctors and Sex Crimes. Vol. 5 of Eighteenth-Century British Erotica Part I
- (ed.) Sodomites, Mollies, Sapphists & Tommies. Vol. 5 of Eighteenth-Century British Erotica Part II

=== Essays reprinted in Gay Roots ===
Gay London in the 1720s; Ganymede Raped - The Critic as Censor; Reflections on the Gay Movement; The Passions of Michelangelo; Hard Gemlike Flame: Walter Pater and His Circle; The Historical Roots of Homophobia (containing material not previously published). Ed. Winston Leyland, San Francisco: Gay Sunshine Press, Vol. I, 1991; Vol. II, 1993.

=== Essays reprinted and translated ===
Enter Willie Hughes as Juliet; in Ist besser, verdorben auch zu sein ..., 21 Shakespeare Nachdichtungen von Leander Sukov, Kulturmaschinen Verlag e.K. 2008, Berlin, Kulturmaschinen Verlag der Autoren, 2020, Hamburg
