= Gay cruising in Australia =

Public places in Australia used for gay encounters

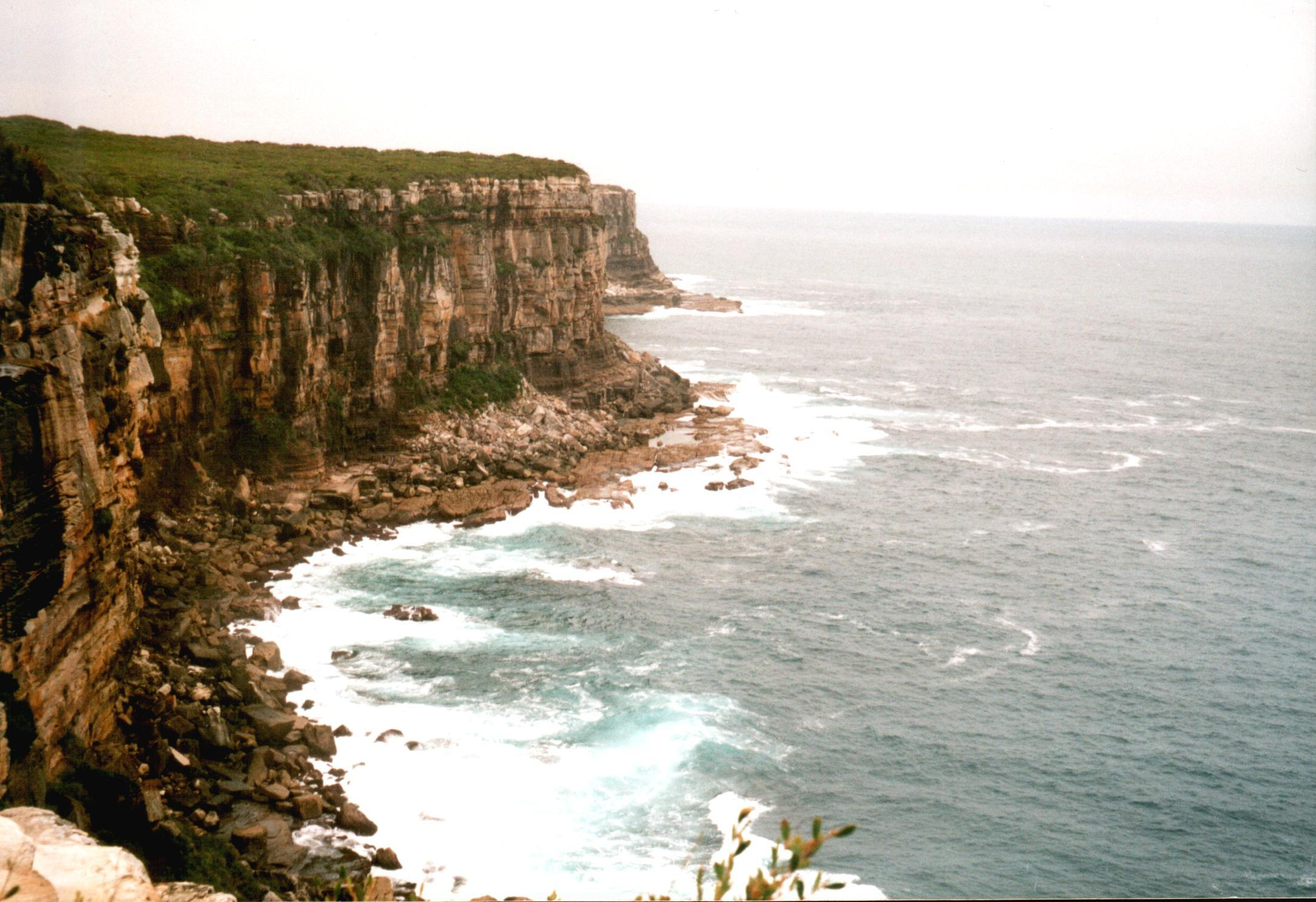
Parts of the natural bushland of Sydney's North Head have historically served as a meeting place for gay men in Sydney.

In Australia, the term beat is used to refer to an area frequented by gay men, where sexual acts occur. This use of the word parodies the beat walked by a police officer or a prostitute. Most commonly, public toilets, parks, and nightclubs are used as beats, though sometimes suburban car parks become beats after nightfall. Sex researchers have found that a considerable proportion of men who use "beats" are men who have sex with men (MSM) rather than gay-identifying. This is possibly because, while gay men have a plethora of venues for meeting legitimately, MSM – who are often closeted – may not wish to risk being observed in (or reported as attending) gay venues.

== History ==
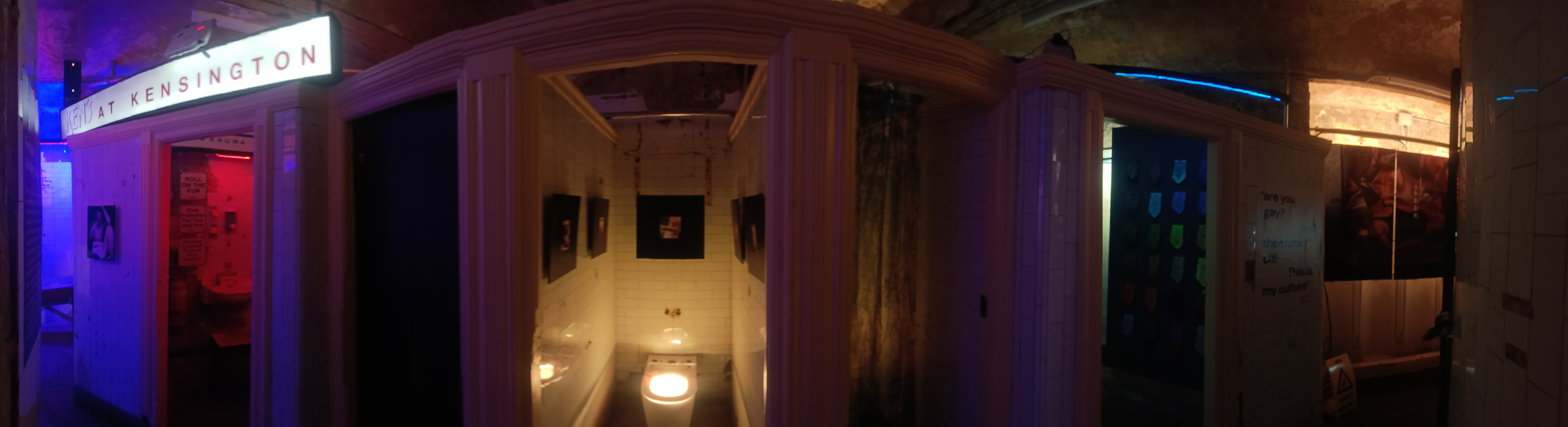
Inside of the underground toilet block exhibition detailing Sydney's gay beat, sauna and cruising culture of the 80's and 90's. The underground male toilets were opened in 1907 in Taylor Square, Darlinghurst, and then closed in 1998 and are now apart of Qtopia Sydney an LGBTQIA+ Museum in Darlinghurst. 2026

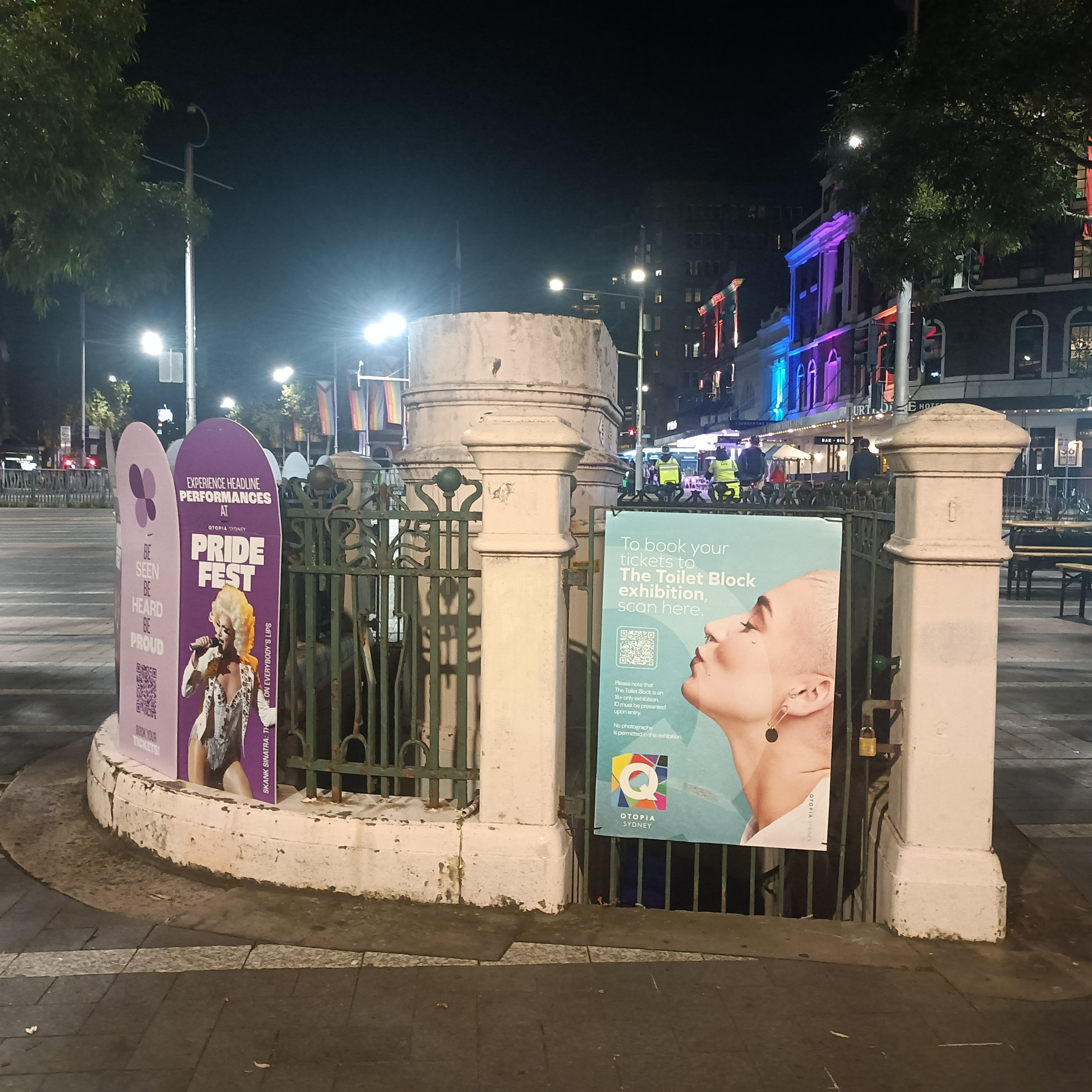
The entrance to the underground toilet block with stairs leading down to the toilets from the northern end of Taylor Square. The toilets were a "...a popular beat in the heart of gay Sydney for decades until its closure..." in 1998. 2025

Although little is known about beats in the early colonial and Federation periods, it is known that specific areas in larger cities, such as Sydney, Melbourne and Brisbane have recorded histories of use for this purpose through the 20th century to the present.

Whilst as of 2026 it has not been active for a long time, a popular cruising area used to exist just off of Yarra Bend Road in Melbourne and it was commented in 2012 that "As a dutiful dog walker I have been an observer of the beat for a long time...In all the years I’ve been walking by, I have only seen this car park empty once...for the cruisers, at least those daytime subjects of my curiosity, are not chatty folk. Their language is a subtle one of glances and head-turns – I’ve never seen them converse. They pull into the car park, sometimes sit for a while, sometimes move straight to the toilets; there are always one or two lonely souls wandering the grass. The men size each other up continuously, hyper-alert to each new arrival. Some stay only briefly, others settle in for the afternoon. Cars come and go, all kinds of cars – muscle cars, tradesmen’s vans, family station wagons. The men are all kinds, too – young, old, business-suited, tracksuited...The busiest times are lunch and after dark – the narrow road becomes jammed."

== Social and sexual behaviour in beats ==
Presently, beats are actively used by men who have sex with men (MSM). Due to the casual nature and anonymity of most of the encounters, beats have been identified as areas of high risk for the transmission of HIV, syphilis and other sexually transmitted infections.

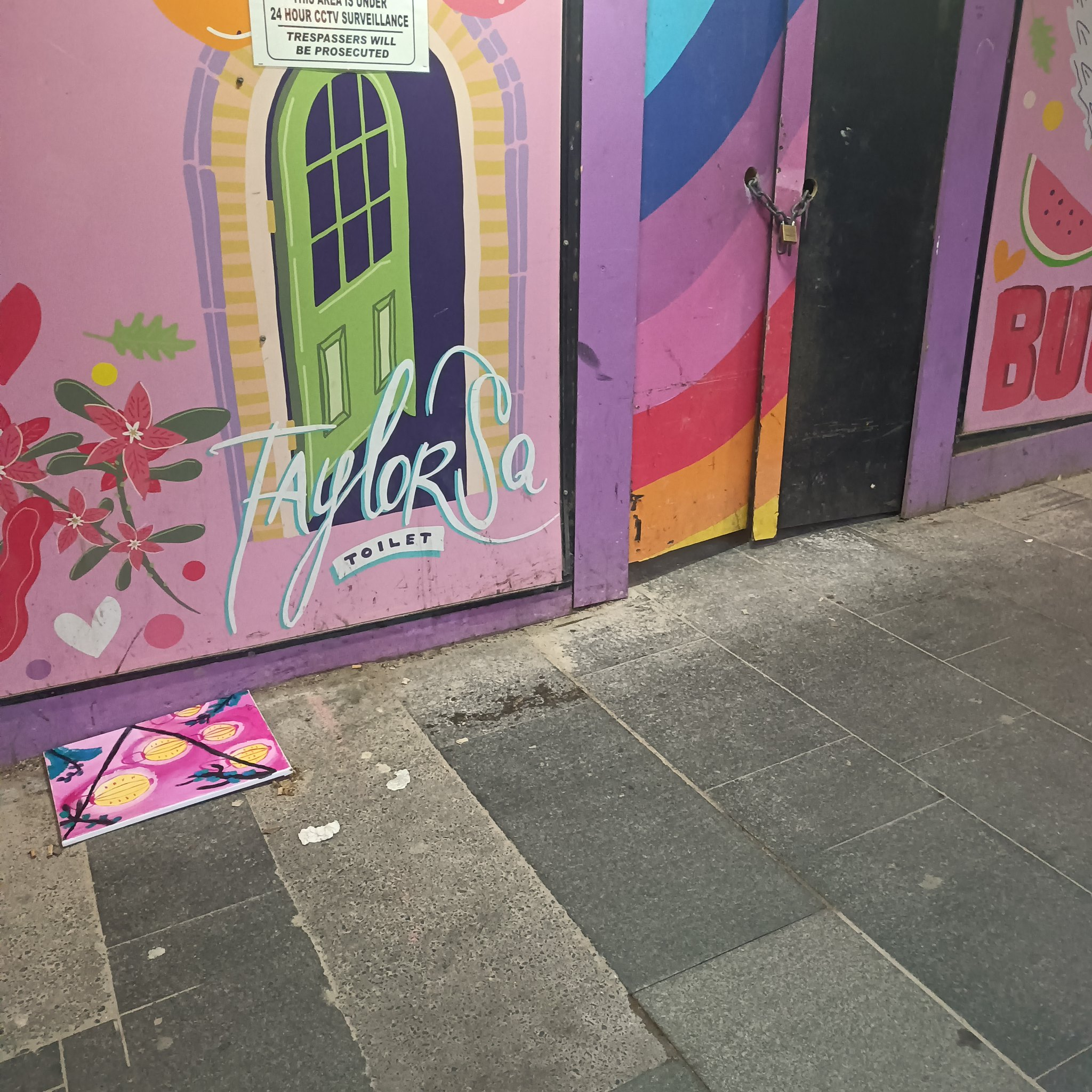
Construction hoarding alongside Oxford street in Darlinghurst, Sydney that references the underground toilets in Taylor Square, Darlinghurst, indicating their connection to the queer community through it being a popular place for people to randomly meet and have sex. 2025

Laud Humphrey's Tearoom Trade, published in 1970, was a sociological analysis and observance between the social space public "restrooms" (as toilets are euphemistically known in the US) offer for anonymous sex and the men—either closeted, gay, or straight—who sought to fulfill sexual desires that their wives, religion, or social lives could not. The study, which was met with praise on one side due to its innovation and criticism on the other due to having outed "straight" men and risked their privacy, brought to light the multidimensionality of public restrooms and the intricacy and complexity of homosexual sex amongst self-identifying straight men.

== Gay beat locations ==
An underground toilet block located at the northern end of Taylor Square, Sydney, that was opened to the public in 1883, was "a popular beat in the heart of gay Sydney for decades until its closure" in 1998.

In 2024 the underground toilet block became a part of Qtopia Sydney, a museum that has an extensive collection of objects related to queer culture in Sydney and the toilet block will now provide exhibition space for the museum. Upon opening in 2024 the toilet block hosted "adults-only exhibitions exploring Sydney's gay beat, sauna and cruising culture of the 1980s and 90s."

== Law ==
Engaging in sexual activity in a public place is against the law in all states and territories in Australia. Police have been criticised for excessive patrolling of known beats, and the defence of entrapment is commonly used by those caught when charged. After George Michael was arrested for "engaging in a lewd act" in a public toilet in Los Angeles in 1998 he commented on the Late Show with David Letterman that "the police are not allowed to do something illegal in order to make you do something illegal, you know, it was definite entrapment." Michael commented further that "actually the police report said that he was simulating urination [...] if you tried to simulate urination doing that with your hand you'd get wee all over the shop is all I can say."

People using beats are also more likely to be subject to homophobic hate crimes and other general crimes than gay men who do not use beats, prompting some to welcome the police presence (Moore 1995). In Sydney and Melbourne at least, gay beats have attracted some attention from some sections of the media. This has led to a police presence at those identified. There was a NSW Parliamentary inquiry that reviewed such hate crimes (public submissions closed 7 November 2018).

== See also ==
- Cottaging
- Cruising for sex
- Gay bathhouse
- Gay cruising in England and Wales
