= Taylor Square Substation No. 6 and Underground Conveniences =

Taylor Square Substation No.6
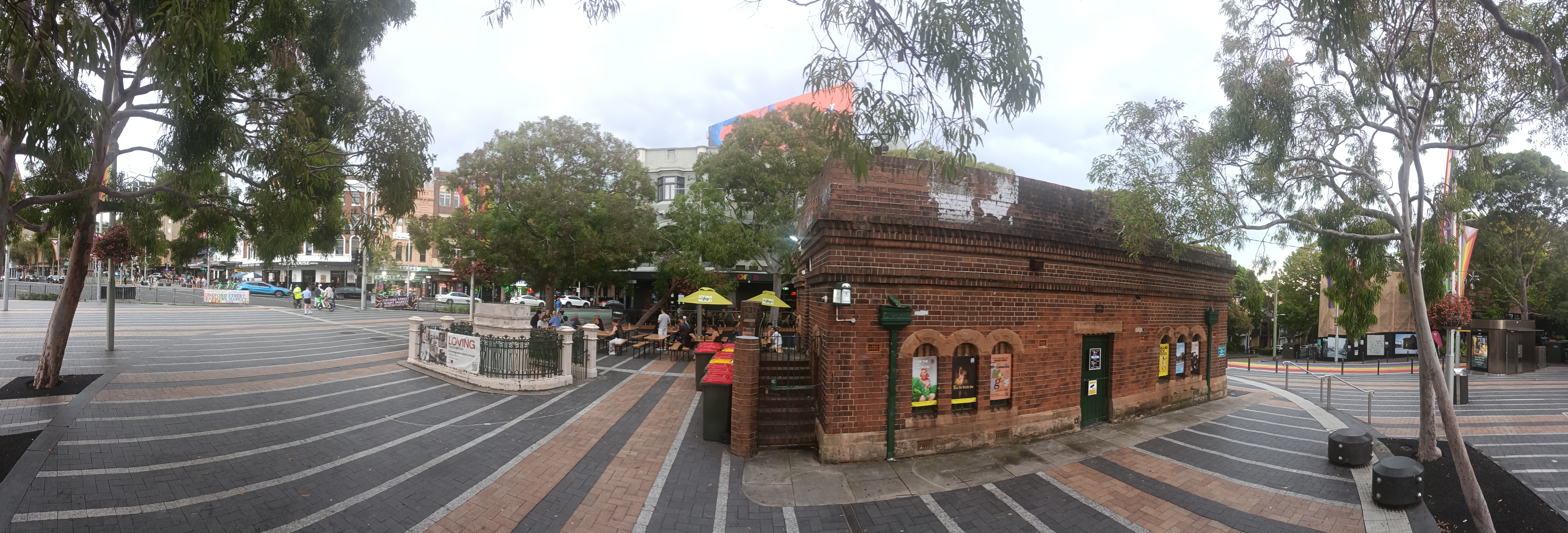
- Taylor Square Substation No. 6 and Underground Conveniences, Taylor Square, New South Wales

- Location within Sydney Location within Australia
- 33.8802°S 151.2170°E
- Location: intersection of Taylor Square, Oxford, Forbes and Bourke Streets, Darlinghurst, New South Wales, Australia

History
- Built: 1904–1907

Site notes
- Architect(s): Robert Hargreave Brodrick (substation & underground conveniences)
- Architectural style: Edwardian Civic
- Owner: City of Sydney

New South Wales Heritage Register
- Official name: Taylor Square Substation No.6 & Underground Public Conveniences; Underground Men's Conveniences; Underground Public Conveniences; Taylor Square toilets; utilities; Electric Substation No. 6; Substation No.1
- Type: state heritage (complex / group)
- Designated: 2 July 2004
- Reference no.: 1700
- Type: Civic Square
- Category: Government and Administration
- Builders: Owen Ridge & Sons (substation) G.D. Getherson (underground conveniences)

Taylor Square Substation No.6 and Underground Conveniences is a heritage-listed electrical substation and underground public toilets at the intersection of Taylor Square, Oxford street, Forbes street and Bourke Street, in the inner city suburb of Darlinghurst in Sydney.

The underground male toilets were opened in 1907 and closed in 1998 and the female toilets were opened in 1938 in the above ground section of the substation building and then closed in 1988.

Both the substation and the underground toilets were designed by Robert Hargreave Brodrick and built from 1904 to 1907, with Owen Ridge & Sons building the substation and G. D. Getherson the underground male toilets.

In 2024, the space inside the substation and the underground toilets began to be used by Qtopia Sydney as an exhibition and performance space to celebrate queer stories in Sydney.

The underground toilet block now hosts "...adults-only exhibitions exploring Sydney's gay beat, sauna and cruising culture of the 1980s and 90s."

== History ==
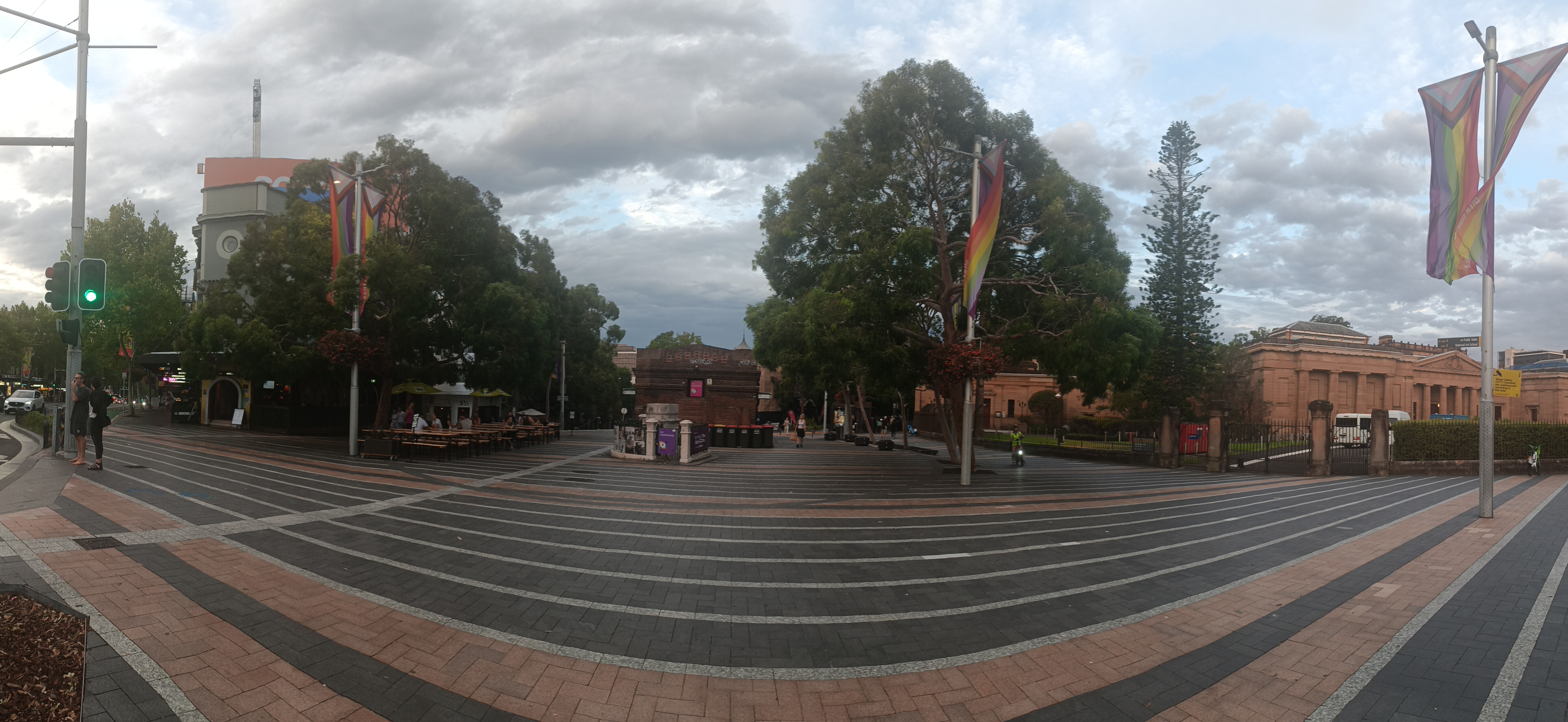
Northern end of Taylor Square with the substation and toilet block. 2026

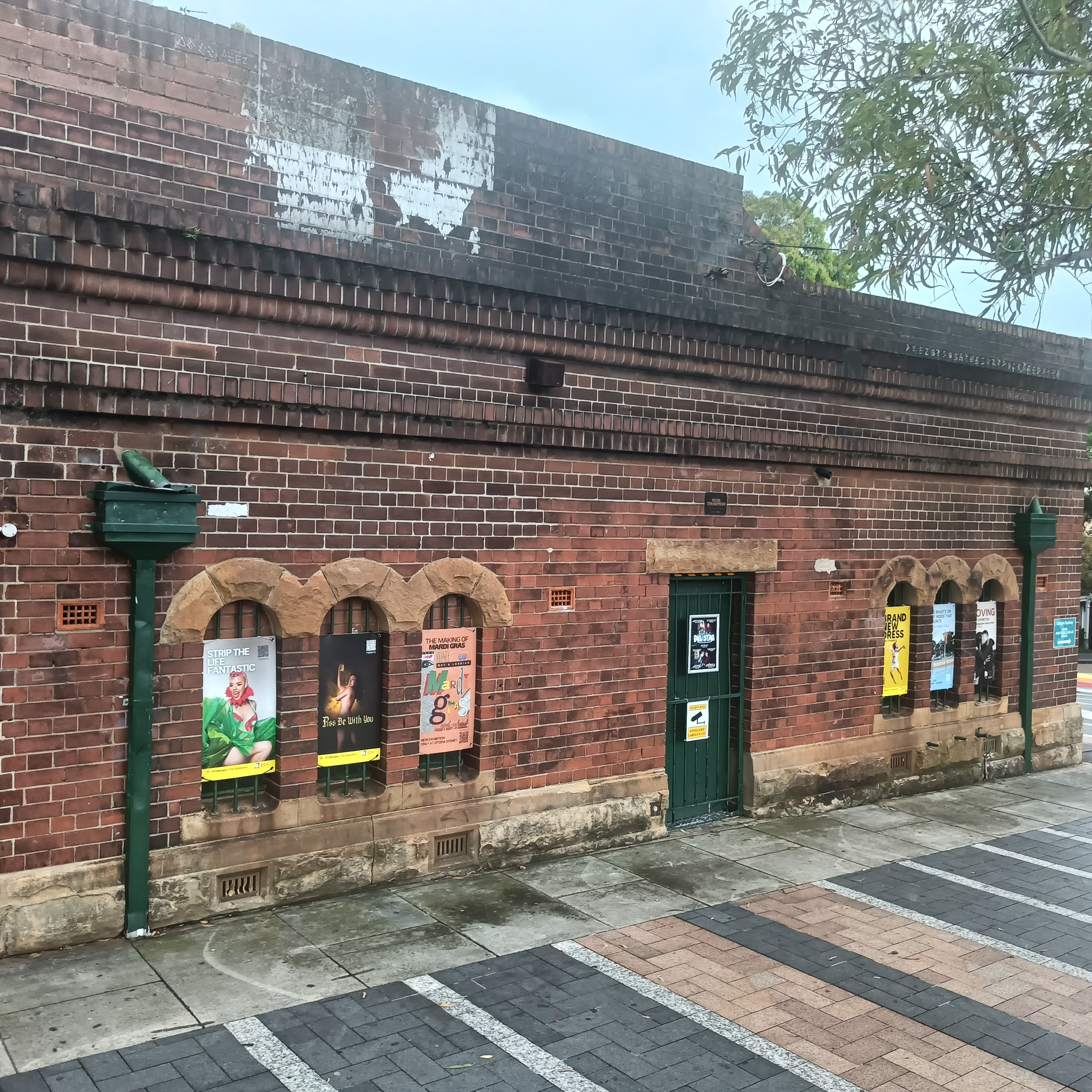
The former electrical substation and female toilets. The door that is visible on the side of this building leads to a set of stairs that go down about 3 metres to where the electrical substation used to be and is now a performance space run by Qtopia. The female toilets that were above this performance space are used by Qtopia as a dressing room for the performers. 2026

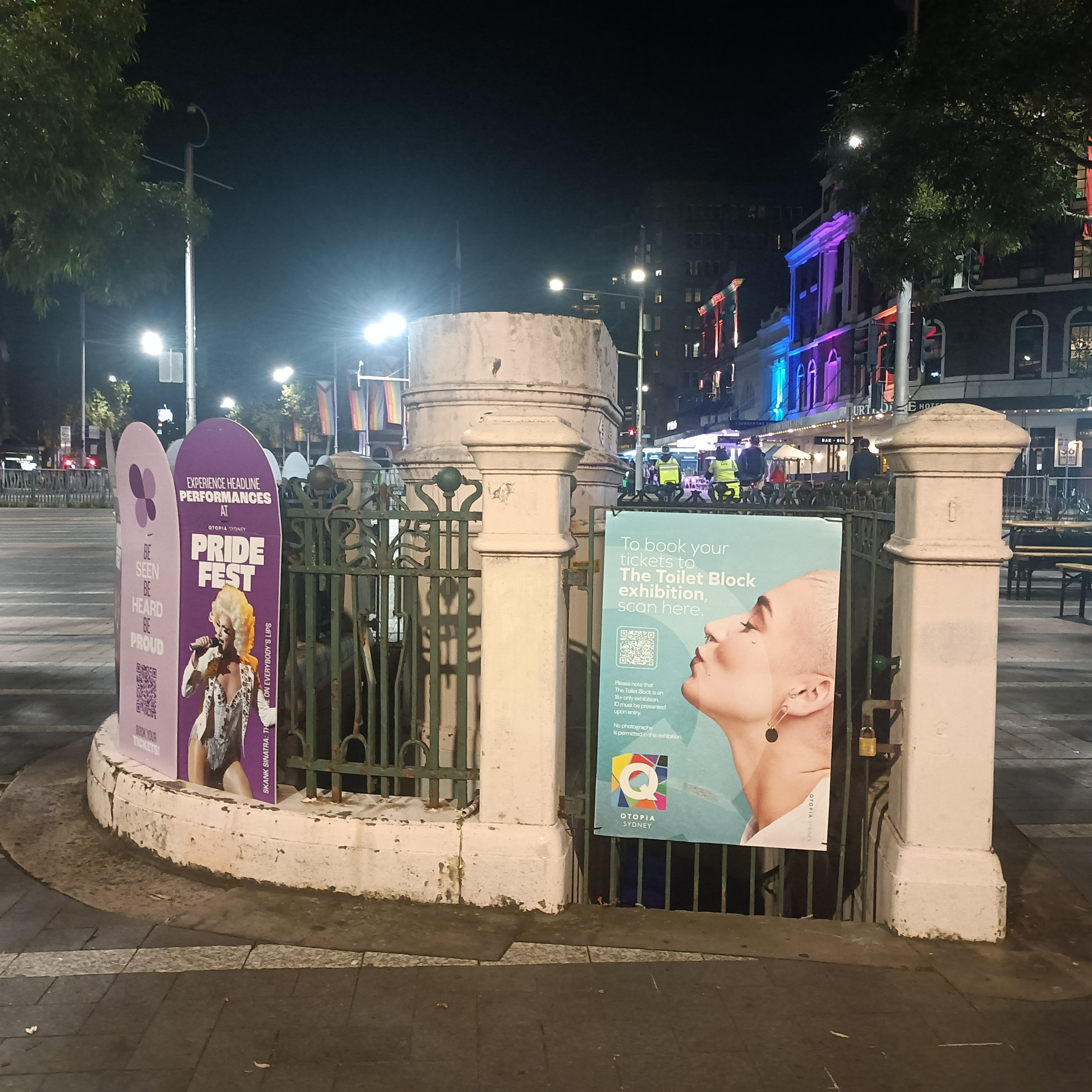
The underground toilets are used by Qtopia as exhibition space. 2026

With its elevated position over the city, the Darlinghurst area has been called Woolloomooloo Heights, Eastern Hill and Henrietta Town. In the 1820s, Governor Ralph Darling renamed the suburb in honour of his wife, Eliza Darling.

In 1883 a public urinal occupied the site at Taylor Square. and in 1885 a steel structure was erected over the urinals to provide a platform for the elevated saltwater tanks. It is believed that these saltwater tanks were used for street cleaning. This early technique of public sanitation provided the rudimentary predecessor to the purpose-designed underground toilets.

The construction of Electricity Substation No. 6 was completed in 1904. It is the most intact of the first five substations built by Sydney Municipal Council that brought electricity to the streets, homes and businesses of Sydney city for the first time. At 5pm on 8 July 1904 the Municipal Council of Sydney's Electricity Undertaking switched on their supply system and the city streets from Circular Quay to Redfern and from Hyde Park to Darling Harbour were lit by electric lights for the first time. Electricity quickly became an exciting new commodity which the council's Electricity Undertaking were trying to sell to both the local councils and private customers. In continuous operation from 1904 to 1993, the Substation building marks the commencement of the major technological transformation of the twentieth century associated with the development of the modern city and state.

In response to the public health and safety concerns, particularly after the outbreak of the bubonic plague in Sydney in 1900, Sydney Municipal Council undertook to build one underground male toilet a year from 1901 to 1911. The Underground male toilets at Taylor Square were built in 1907, replacing the public urinals and the saltwater tank, and they were the sixth underground toilets to be constructed in Sydney. There were twelve Underground toilets built in Sydney with the toilets at Taylor Square possibly the oldest extant public toilets in Sydney.

Together, the construction of these purpose-designed, high quality, Civic buildings within the public domain formed part of the introduction of the City Beautiful movement into Sydney that drove the complete remodelling of Oxford Street and associated creation of Taylor Square in 1907. The public space, Civic buildings and streets were remodelled to provide for the introduction of the State's first electric tram and to improve city design and traffic movement throughout Victorian Sydney. While the Substation provided the electricity for the newly introduced electric tram, the toilets serviced the large volume of tram commuters. The City Beautiful movement was evident throughout Sydney with the construction of a total of twelve of these purpose-designed Public Underground toilets located in the public domain of the city, often associated with the tram lines, of which the Taylor Square toilets remain the only extant example.

The first female public toilets in Sydney were provided in 1910 at Hyde Park, then at Railway Square and Circular Quay. In 1938 after years of debate on a "suitable" location for equivalent female toilets in Taylor Square and in response to active petitioning from the Women's Progressive Association, council modified the existing Substation to accommodate female toilets. These were the first female public toilets at Taylor Square, some 55 years after the first male public urinal was opened in Taylor Square in 1883. The allocation of a public female toilet in Taylor Square and the manner and timeframe in which this was achieved, symbolises the evolution in social attitudes as well as the growing activism of feminist groups in Sydney during the early 20th Century.

The brick building known as the substation that is in the northern end of Taylor Square is the location of where the female toilets were installed. There are stairs leading up from Taylor Square to a doorway in the southern end of the substation building and this door is the entry for the female toilets. A second door, in the eastern side of the substation leads to a set of steps that extend downwards about 3 metres to a large space underneath the female toilets. This large space used to be where the electrical substation was and it is now a 40-seat theatre used by Qtopia Sydney to host performances.

The female toilets were closed to public access in 1988 and the substation decommissioned in 1993. The male toilets were closed to public access in 1998.

The property is owned by the City of Sydney and it was added to the New South Wales State Heritage Register on 2 July 2004. Since 2024 both the substation and the toilet block have been used by Qtopia Sydney as exhibition spaces for LGBTQIA+ history and culture.

== Qtopia ==
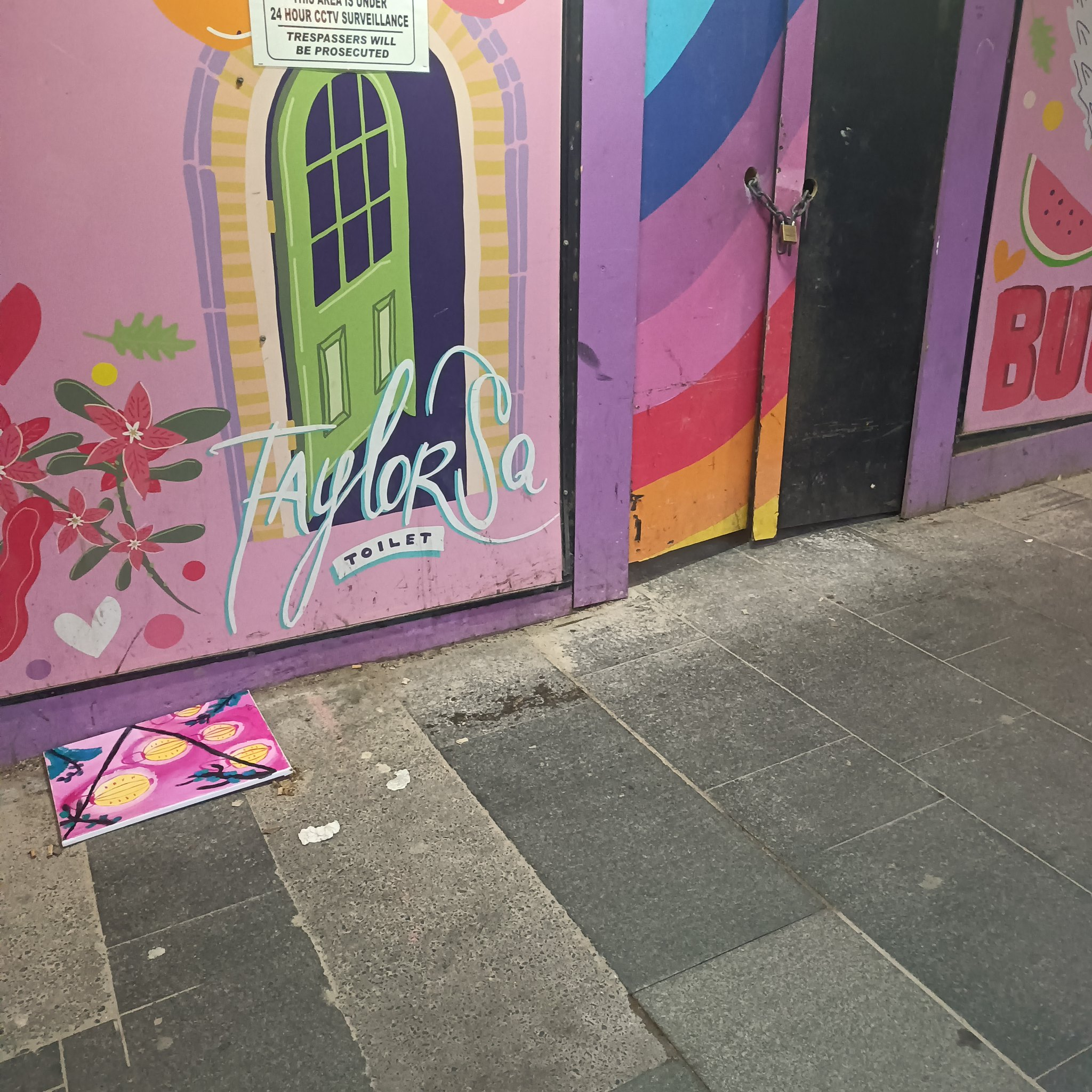
Construction hoarding along Oxford street in Darlinghurst, that references the underground toilets in Taylor Square, indicating its connection to the queer community through it being a beat.

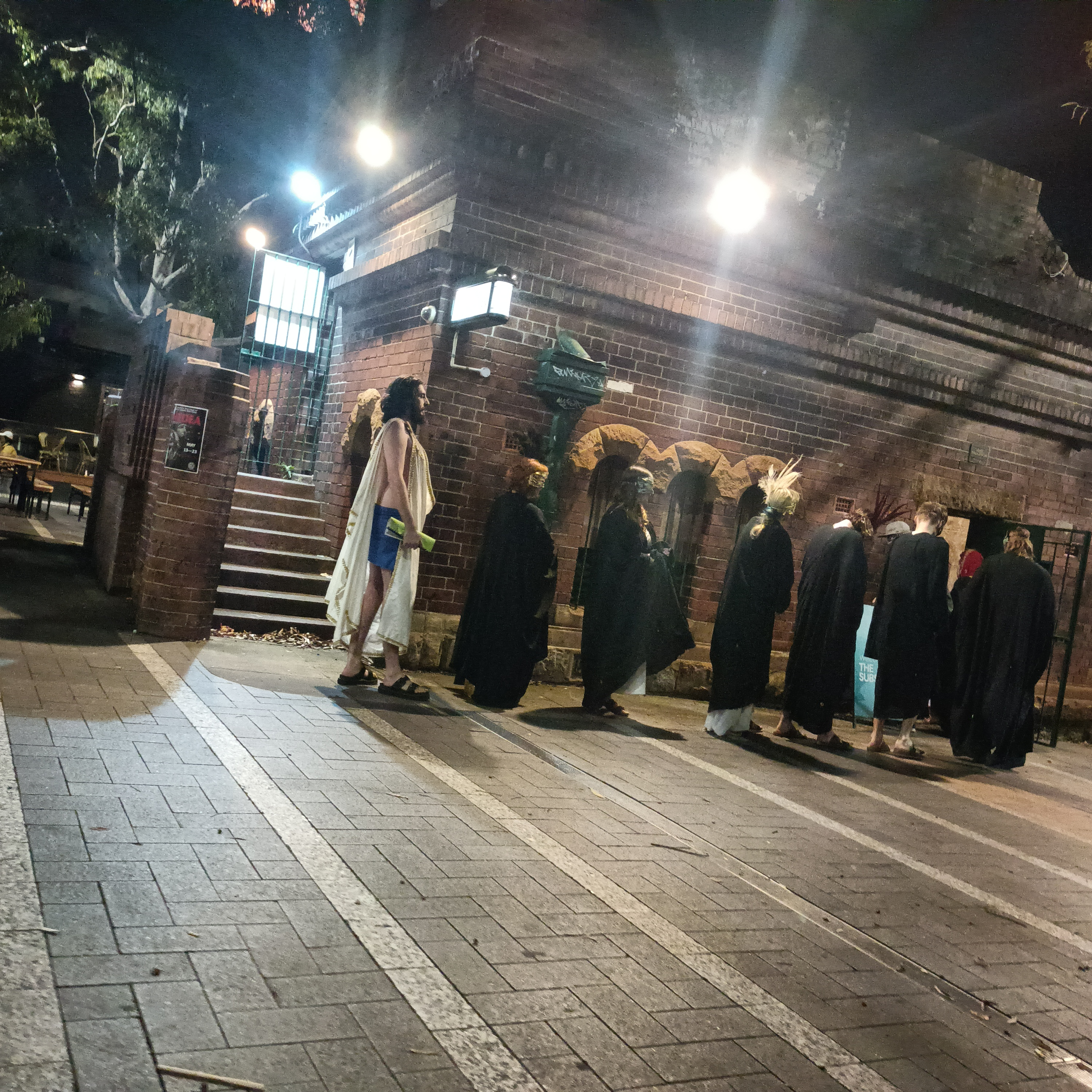
Performers in costumes entering the substation. The stairs on the left lead to a doorway that used to be the entrance to the female public toilets until they closed in 1998 and they are now used as a dressing room for the performers. 2026

In February 2024, a new museum, titled Qtopia, opened in Darlinghurst, celebrating queer stories with an extensive collection of objects related to queer culture in Sydney. It sits across three main sites which include the main building at 301 Forbes St., Darlinghurst, the substation and the underground toilet block, both of which are located at the northern end of Taylor Square.

It initially began as a temporary exhibition held during Sydney World Pride in 2023 and was located in the bandstand pavilion in Green Park, Darlinghurst, as well as at the National Art School that sits adjacent to Green Park in Darlinghurst. The substations 40-seat theatre hosts performances including music, drag, comedy, cabaret and poetry all year round with numerous performances being held in conjunction with the Sydney Gay and Lesbian Mardi Gras in February and March each year as well as during Pride month in June of each year. The underground toilet block now hosts "...adults-only exhibitions exploring Sydney's gay beat, sauna and cruising culture of the 1980s and 90s." It has been commented that "The public toilet was also a popular beat in the heart of gay Sydney for decades until its closure...".

== Description ==
=== Substation No. 6 ===
The Substation has a rectangular plan and is constructed in load bearing face brick with rusticated sandstone lintels, arches and base coursing, and is dressed with sandstone top coursing, window sills, and window heads. Brickwork string coursing and corbels are featured near the parapet, which steps up towards the southern end. The parapet features a bullnose course, projecting course and brick end capping. The external brickwork reveals the former outline of the 1904 sandstone buttresses and freestone copings. The 1928 parapet line is also evident. The 1938 Art Deco southern wall that leads to the stairs to the female toilets remains.

The floor level of the Substation is located below the pavement level and is accessed via a street stair from Bourke Street. The landing is edged in decorative steel. Access to an internal mezzanine platform is also available from the pavement level on the eastern side of the substation via a single leaf door.

The western and eastern elevations have two groups of three timber arched windows symmetrically placed about central doors. To the north, the three separate openings, of similar arched shape, contain painted steel horizontal louvres behind fixed metal screens. To the south the windows, which originally mirrored the north, have been bricked up and the central window replaced with a door opening for the female toilets. The steel rainwater heads and downpipes from the 1928 alterations and additions have been retained, as has the 1938 "Ladies" signs.

Internally, the ground floor of the Substation is free of internal partitions. The upper-level floor and walls are supported on steel beams situated above the substation wall. The ground floor is concrete with trenches running along the eastern, western and southern walls with metal cover plates. The walls are rendered and painted brickwork. The piers still exist on the western wall.

=== Underground Men's Conveniences ===
The Edwardian style underground male toilets are characterised externally by a wrought iron fence and gates, with Art Nouveau detailing that are set on a painted sandstone base, and a central masonry podium (the air vent) located at the centre of the curved stairs, which originally supported a decorative metal vent capping. The toilets are accessed from pavement level via two separate interlocking curved staircases that encircle a central vent. Two masonry piers flank the two entry gates to the staircases.

Internally, the main subterranean structure is enclosed in a brickwork cavity with a curved concrete ceiling supported by exposed steel beams. The symmetrical plan of the underground toilets is arranged around the circular core containing the pair of interlocking curved stairs and air vent, and comprises five toilet cubicles and two ceramic urinal stalls. An attendant's room is located under the stairs and air vent, and features a low arched entrance and original arched timber door with multi paned glazing. The internal walls of the toilets feature white florite glass tiles and ceramic tiles frieze with art Nouveau green floral patterns at a high level, which have been painted. Much of the original joinery, including timber framed doors, timber framed louvres and moulded timber architraves, has survived.

Modern services, including fluorescent lights, electrical cabling and mechanical ventilation ducts have also been introduced to the internal space.

=== Women's Conveniences ===
The female toilets are located inside the substation and are accessed from Taylor Square by stairs at the southern end of the building. Underneath the female toilets is a large space that continues about 3 metres underground and this is where the electrical substation was located. Much of the original partitioning, joinery and sanitary fixtures have been retained. The toilets remain in the cubicles along the western wall with wash basins located along the northern wall. The entrance is lined with cream square ceramic tiles, the floor covered in linoleum with red skirting. The wired glass skylights are patterned with metal ventilation grilles to the ceiling.

=== Condition ===
As at 27 November 2003:

The toilets were in good structural condition. However, there has been leaking though the roof which requires a new membrane. The steel beams supporting the roof show signs of rusting which should be cleaned of paint and rust and structural adequacy assessed prior to recoating the beams. Some tiling has been damaged.

The Substation were generally in good structural condition except for the two end gable parapets which have substantial cracking that requires attention.

Additional research and investigation is required to gauge the archaeological potential of the site. There is a high level of original integrity of both structures.

=== Modifications and dates ===
- 1904: Electrical Substation No.6 constructed (originally known as Substation No.1).
- 1905: Temporary staircase of Substation replaced with permanent iron staircase.
- 1907: Underground male public toilets constructed.
- 1928/1938: Saltwater tanks removed prior to this time. Alterations included the removal of the buttresses, raising of the roof, removal of sandstone coping and straightening of the brick parapet.
- 1938: Ladies toilets constructed within substation building, built by Mr S Featherstone, costing 493 pounds.
- 1940: Alterations to the Underground toilets, including replacement of two existing banks of urinal stalls, installation of bakelite seats in water closets, repairs to iron gates, and improvements to lighting at entrances.
- 1961: Further minor renovations and alterations to Underground toilets.
- 1988: Underground toilets closed to the public.
- 1993: Substation decommissioned.
- 2001: Art exhibition installed in Underground toilets known as "Inverted Belvedere" (from 15/9/2001 - 6/10/2001) causing some damage to internal finishes.

== Heritage listing ==
The Underground Public toilets and Substation No. 6 are a rare and distinctive group of public utilities from early-twentieth century Sydney. They are of State heritage significance within the aesthetic, historic, associations, technical, social, representative and rarity criteria, as a group and individually.

The Taylor Square group contains the oldest, surviving underground public toilet in Sydney (built in 1907), and the most intact of the first Electric Substations of New South Wales (built in 1904) that first brought sanitation reform and electricity to the public streets of Sydney City and New South Wales. As the oldest extant examples in Sydney, they a rare and lasting record of the major reforms and achievements of the early 20th Century in sanitation, public health, technology and City design, which transformed Sydney and the other city centres of Australia into modern cities. The only other known examples of purpose-designed public underground toilets in Australia from this era of public health reform are located in the inner city of Melbourne and have been identified as nationally significant.

Both buildings are fine examples of Edwardian Civic architecture, designed by the prominent City Surveyor and Architect, Robert Hargreave Brodrick, and are landmarks of Taylor Square. Together, these fine Civic buildings have formed part of the identity of Taylor Square since its creation in the early 1900s, and are associated with the State's first electric tram service that once ran through this intersection, a key tram junction at the time. The quality, design and function of these buildings also represents the introduction of the City Beautiful movement into Sydney during the early 20th Century, a movement that drove the complete remodelling of this town square and Oxford Street to improve urban design and traffic movement within Sydney.

These Taylor Square buildings have provided the constant setting to developments of national significance in Australian society, as the symbolic birthplace and growth of gay pride activism in Australia since the first gay pride march commenced at Taylor Square in 1978, and as a continuing focus of the annual Mardi Gras, an internationally recognised event. The group also contains the first public female toilet of Taylor Square, built in 1938 within the Substation building, demonstrating the growing activism of feminist groups in Sydney and the changing public role of women during the early 20th Century.

Taylor Square Substation No.6 was listed on the New South Wales State Heritage Register on 2 July 2004 having satisfied the following criteria.

The place is important in demonstrating the course, or pattern, of cultural or natural history in New South Wales.

The Underground Public Toilets and Substation No. 6 form a group of public utility structures established in central Sydney during the early twentieth century. The buildings are remnant evidence of the introduction of the State's first electric tram that once ran through this intersection, and the major tram junction at Taylor Square, as the construction of the substation and toilets was associated with servicing the new electric tram lines and commuters. The isolated location of the buildings within the original roadway (formerly alongside the tram lines), their function, quality, scale and age provide evidence of these former tram lines and junction, and their important role at the time as a major form of transportation.

The provision of purpose-designed underground toilets in the public domain to replace the former public urinal in this location, demonstrates the changing importance of public health and sanitation during this era, in response to the public health crisis in Sydney from the outbreak of bubonic plague in 1900.

Built in 1907, the Underground Public toilets are the oldest extant underground toilets in Sydney, of which there were originally twelve. They are also possibly the oldest extant public toilets in Sydney.

Electricity Substation No. 6, constructed in 1904, is one of the first five substations built by Sydney Municipal Council that brought electricity to the streets, homes and businesses of Sydney city for the first time in 1904. It is the most intact of the two surviving examples of these first substations. In continuous operation from 1904 to 1993, the building marks the commencement of the major technological transformation of the twentieth century associated with the development of the modern city and state.

The place has a strong or special association with a person, or group of persons, of importance of cultural or natural history of New South Wales's history.

The Substation and Underground toilets have provided the setting to developments in Australian society, as the birthplace and development of gay pride activism in Australia since the first gay pride march commenced at Taylor Square in 1978. This iassociation of the place with the gay and lesbian community has continued, as it remains a focus of the annual Mardi Gras. The place has a well-established profile for this association not only in Australia but internationally.

The place is important in demonstrating aesthetic characteristics and/or a high degree of creative or technical achievement in New South Wales.

Electricity Substation No. 6 and the Underground toilets have been landmarks of Taylor Square since its formation in the early Twentieth Century, identifying one of Sydney City's defining public spaces, major thoroughfares and processional route into and out of the city.

The buildings are fine examples of Edwardian Civic architecture, with Interwar Art Deco overlays, both originally designed by the prominent City Surveyor and Architect, Robert Hargreave Brodrick. The quality and design of the buildings represent the introduction of the ideals of the City Beautiful movement into Sydney to improve City design and traffic movement at the time, which drove the complete remodelling of Oxford Street and creation of Taylor Square in 1907.

Together, the buildings contribute to one of the most intact Victorian and Edwardian streetscapes in Sydney, and reinforce the Civic precinct on the northern side of Taylor Square relating to the significant Darlinghurst Courthouse and the Sydney Municipal Council buildings along Oxford Street (1907–16).

The place has a strong or special association with a particular community or cultural group in New South Wales for social, cultural or spiritual reasons.

The two Civic buildings mark the town square that holds important associations with the gay and lesbian community, as the centre for the recognised homosexual community since the 1960s, and as the birthplace and development of gay pride activism in Australia. Taylor Square provided the starting point of the first gay pride march in 1978, formed the focus of subsequent rallies, demonstrations and confrontations with Police, and continues to play an important role in the annual Mardi Gras, a highly popular and internationally recognised event.

The substation and underground toilets are socially significant as a community meeting place of Taylor Square and Oxford Street, and are important to the community's sense of place.

The place has potential to yield information that will contribute to an understanding of the cultural or natural history of New South Wales.

Substation No. 6 retains its ability to demonstrate its original use and design intent and has considerable potential to yield information about the earliest operation of electrical services and provision of electrical supply to Sydney.

Evidence of the earlier salt water tanks that were originally located on the site above the substation are also retained, which provide information on the early techniques of street cleaning, sanitation and public health. These tanks provided the rudimentary predecessor to the Underground Public toilets where the salt water was used for street cleaning over the 1883 public urinal.

The underground toilets, replacing the former public urinal and salt water tanks, demonstrate the advancements in sanitation technology in the public domain of Sydney during the early 20th century, as a result the public health crisis of the outbreak of the Bubonic Plague in 1900.

The place possesses uncommon, rare or endangered aspects of the cultural or natural history of New South Wales.

The Underground Public toilets are rare in Australia as the oldest extant underground toilets in Sydney. The other known examples of public underground toilets from the same era of public health reform are in the inner-City of Melbourne and have been assessed as nationally significant.

The Underground Public toilets are rare in the State as the only surviving example of the first group of public underground toilets in the inner-City of Sydney (of which there were originally twelve). Of this first group, the Taylor Square toilet was also the only one to feature interlocking curved staircases.

Substation No. 6 is rare in the State as the most intact of the first substations constructed in the State, and which was in continuous operation from 1904 to 1993.

Together, these early examples of Civic utilities provide evidence of the technological developments of the early 20th century that transformed Australia's city centres into modern cities.

The place is important in demonstrating the principal characteristics of a class of cultural or natural places/environments in New South Wales.

The group of buildings at Taylor Square represent fine examples of Edwardian Civic architecture, which together demonstrate the City Beautiful movement to improve urban design of the public domain and traffic movement that transformed parts of Sydney during the early 20th Century.

As the oldest most-intact examples of their type, the buildings also demonstrate the major technological achievements and reforms of the early 20th Century in sanitation, public health and power supply that transformed Sydney into a modern City.

The buildings are landmarks of the Taylor Square precinct that is and has been held in high esteem by the homosexual community since the 1960s, representing the centre of the recognised gay community since this time, representing the birthplace of gay pride activism in Australia in 1978, and the development of these origins into the internationally recognised and highly popular Mardi Gras.

== See also ==
- Taylor Square
- LGBTQ culture in Sydney
- Media related to Taylor Square Substation No. 6 and Underground Conveniences at Wikimedia Commons
