= Taylor Square =

Public square in Sydney, Australia

Coordinates: 33.8808°S 151.2169°E

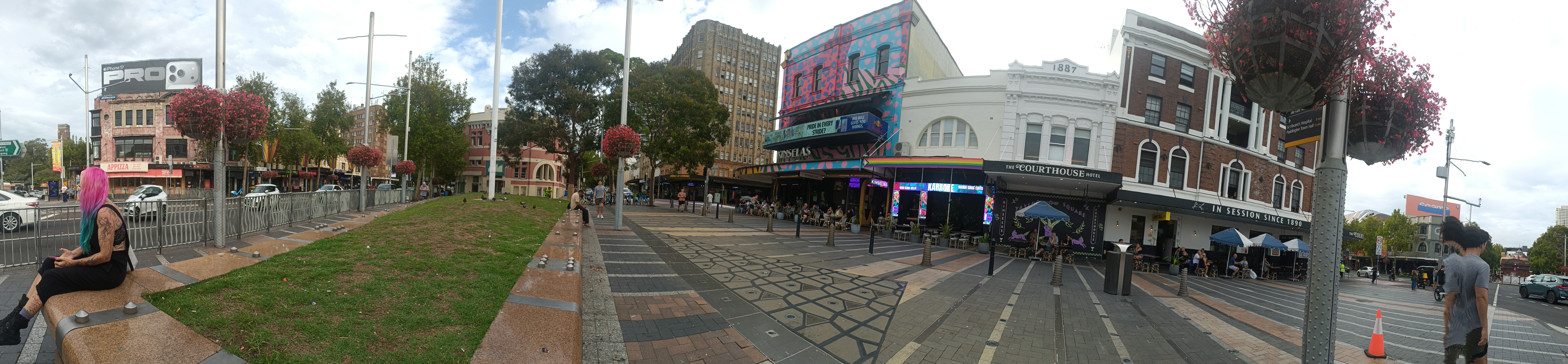
Southern end of Taylor Square, Darlinghurst. 2026.

Taylor Square is a public square in Sydney, New South Wales, Australia. Taylor Square is located beside a major road junction, at the intersection of Bourke, Forbes, Oxford and Flinders Streets. Taylor Square is also on the border of the suburbs of Darlinghurst and Surry Hills.

== Description ==
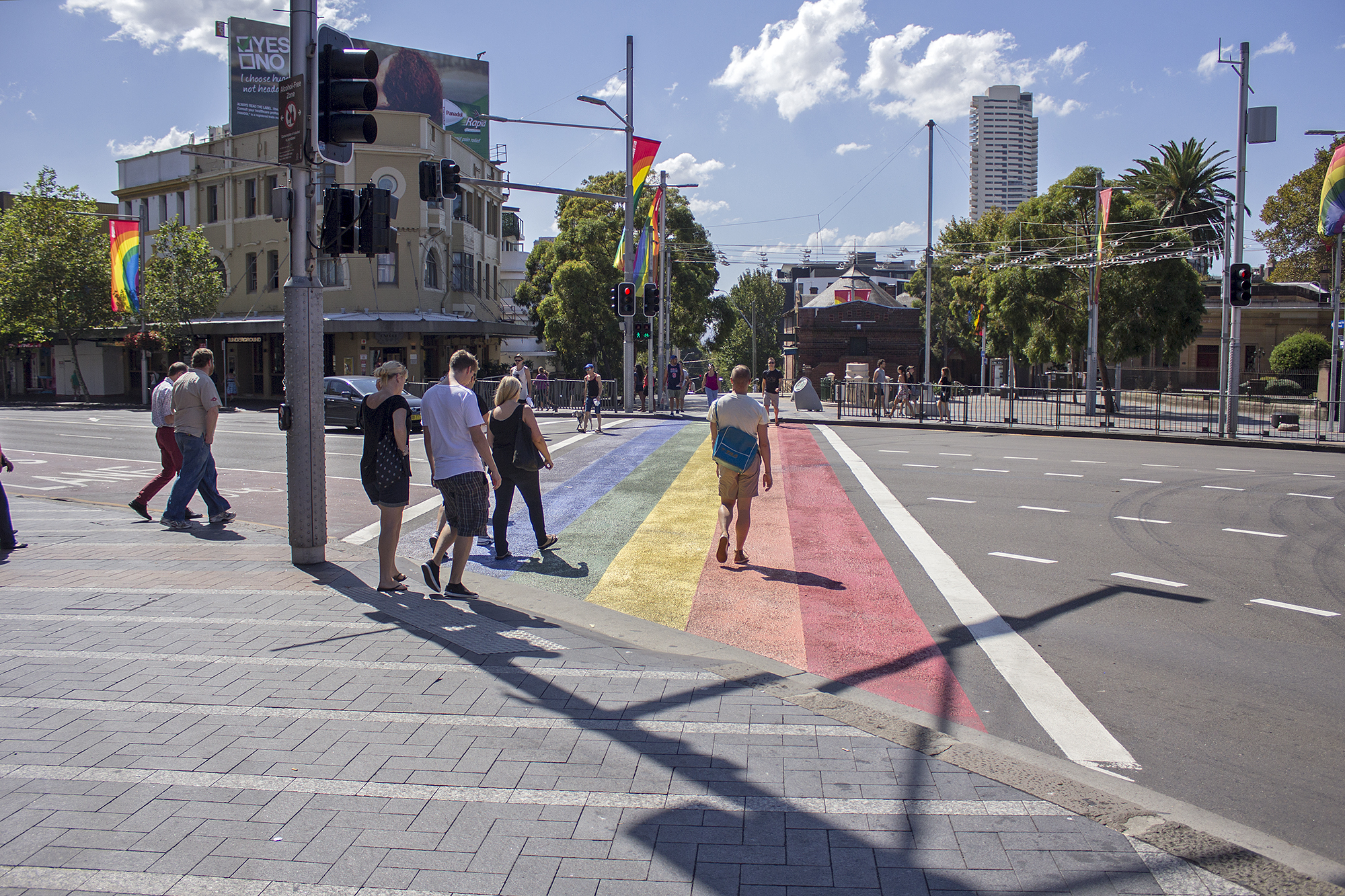
The first temporary rainbow crossing in Australia located between the southern and northern ends of Taylor Square on Oxford St. It was first installed in February 2013 for the Sydney Gay and Lesbian Mardi Gras and then removed in April 2013.

Taylor Square sits at the intersection of Bourke, Forbes, Oxford and Flinders streets above the tunnel section of the Eastern Distributor. The square is named after Sir Allen Taylor (1864–1940), a timber merchant, ship builder and Lord Mayor of Sydney who was responsible for the widening of Oxford Street during his tenure.

The area formerly bound by the traffic of the three streets is popularly known as "Gilligan's Island" because of three large palm trees that once occupied the strip, but have since been subsequently removed. The opening of the Eastern Distributor in December 1999 also entailed the realignment of traffic flow in the area. Direct vehicle access across Oxford Street via Bourke Street is no longer possible.

The locality is a centre of the city's nightlife, especially for its LGBTQIA+ community. Two permanent tributes are the large rainbow flag and rainbow crossing, built in 2014 and 2019 respectively.

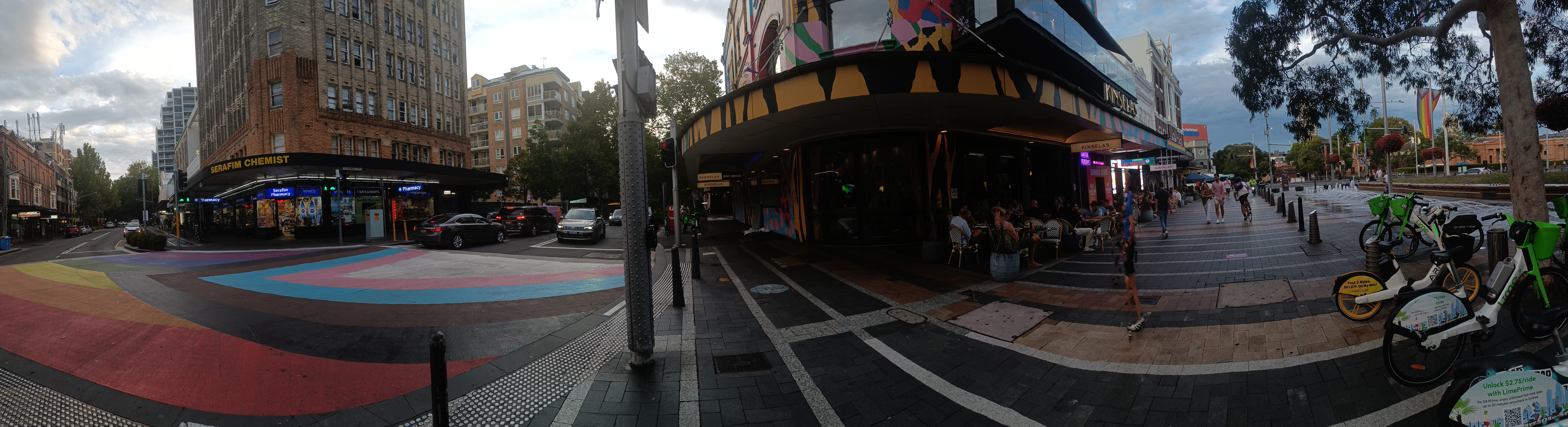
A new rainbow crossing was installed in 2019, and was updated in 2024 to include the progress pride flag. The crossing sits adjacent to the southern end of Taylor Square, on the corner of Campbell and Bourke streets, on the border between Surry Hills and Darlinghurst.

Darlinghurst Courthouse is an imposing sandstone building on Taylor Square. It was designed by architect Mortimer Lewis (1796–1879) in 1844 and has a Greek Revival style façade. The central block is adapted from an 1823 design in Peter Nicholson's The New Practical Builder.

The first temporary rainbow crossing in Australia was located between the southern and northern ends of Taylor Square on Oxford St and was first installed in February 2013 for the Sydney Gay and Lesbian Mardi Gras and then removed in April 2013. The temporary crossing was inspired by two rainbow crossings that were created in time for the 2012 LA Pride Parade and were located alongside the LA Pride Parade route on Santa Monica Boulevard. A new permanent rainbow crossing was installed in 2019 adjacent to the southern end of Taylor Square, and was updated in 2024 to include the progress pride flag.

The square also features a large water fountain built into the pavement. This was part of a $5.25 million upgrade, in 2003, including lighting and a grass terrace. The fountain is currently being reviewed for upgrade and repair by the City of Sydney Council.

== Qtopia ==
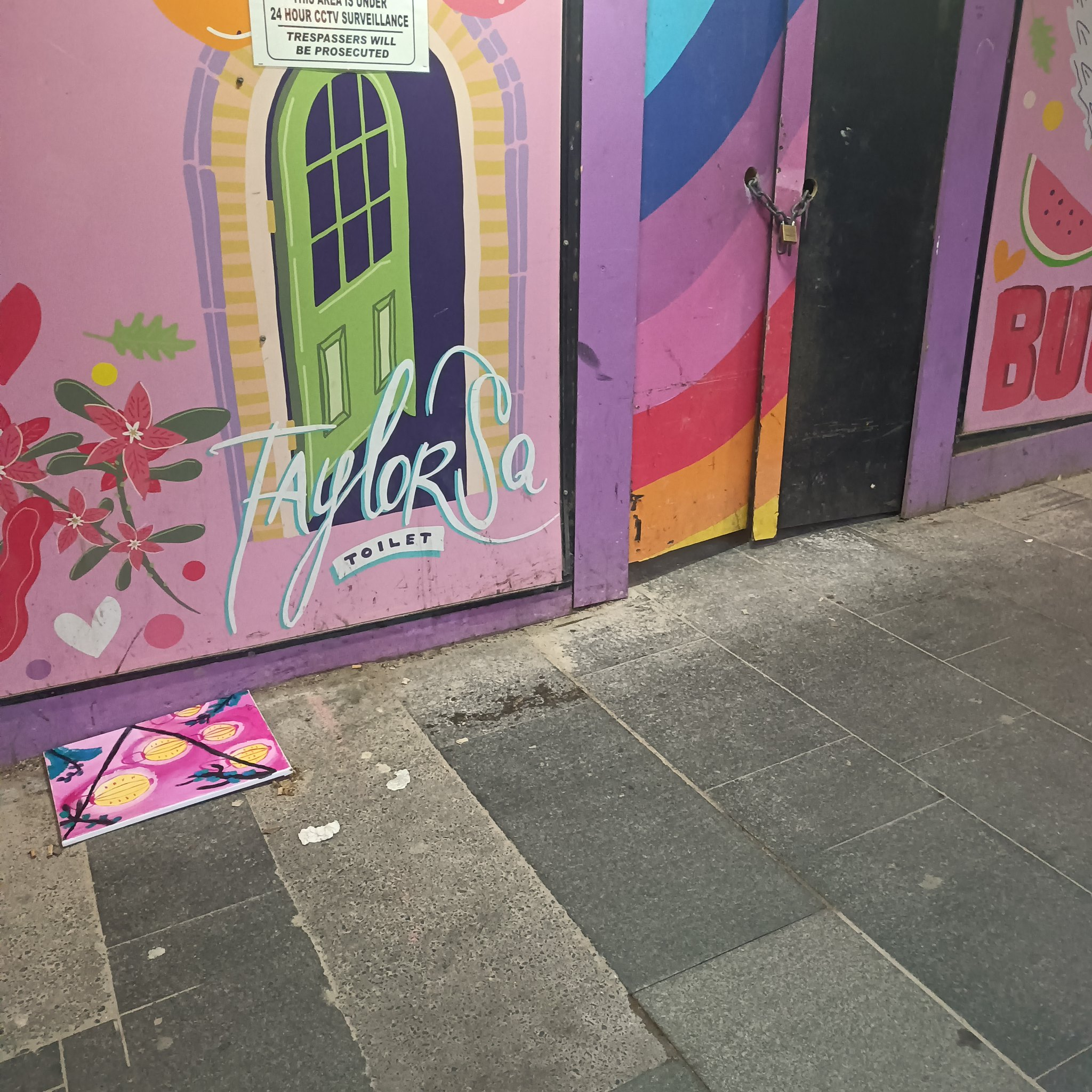
Construction hoarding along Oxford street in Darlinghurst, that references the underground toilets in Taylor Square, indicating its connection to the queer community through it being a beat.

In February 2024, a new museum, titled Qtopia, opened in Darlinghurst, celebrating queer stories with an extensive collection of objects related to queer culture in Sydney. It sits across three main sites which include the main building at 301 Forbes St., Darlinghurst, the substation and the underground toilet block, both of which are located at the northern end of Taylor Square.

It initially began as a temporary exhibition held during Sydney World Pride in 2023 and was located in the bandstand pavilion in Green Park, Darlinghurst, as well as at the National Art School that sits adjacent to Green Park in Darlinghurst. The underground toilet block was opened to the public in 1907 and then closed in 1998 and it now hosts "exhibitions exploring Sydney's gay beat, sauna and cruising culture of the 1980s and 90s." and it was itself the location of a popular beat in Sydney for decades until its closure in 1998. The substations 40-seat theatre hosts performances including music, drag, comedy, cabaret and poetry all year round with numerous performances being held in conjunction with the Sydney Gay and Lesbian Mardi Gras in February and March each year as well as during Pride month in June of each year.

== History ==
Taylor Square was the site of the public execution of John Knatchbull for murder in 1844, with a crowd of 10,000 people reportedly in attendance.

== Gallery ==
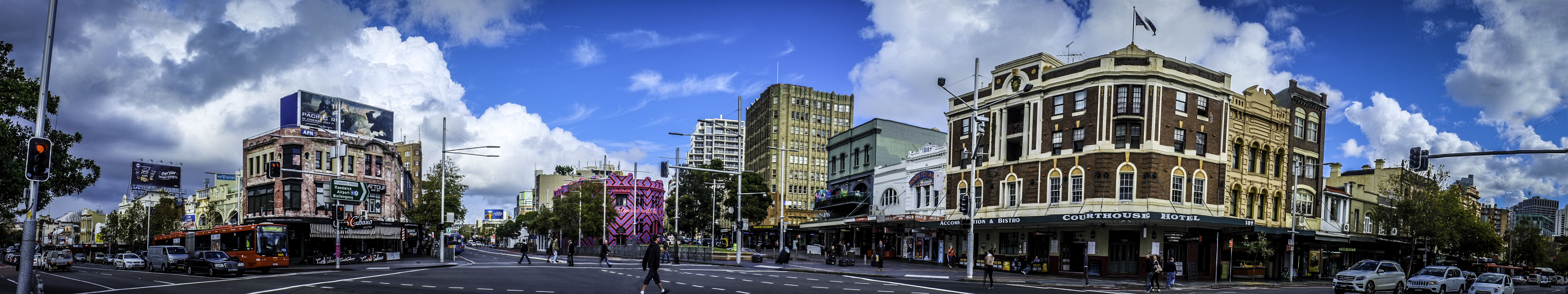
Panorama showing the intersection of Oxford st and Flinders st at Taylor Square, Darlinghurst. 2013.

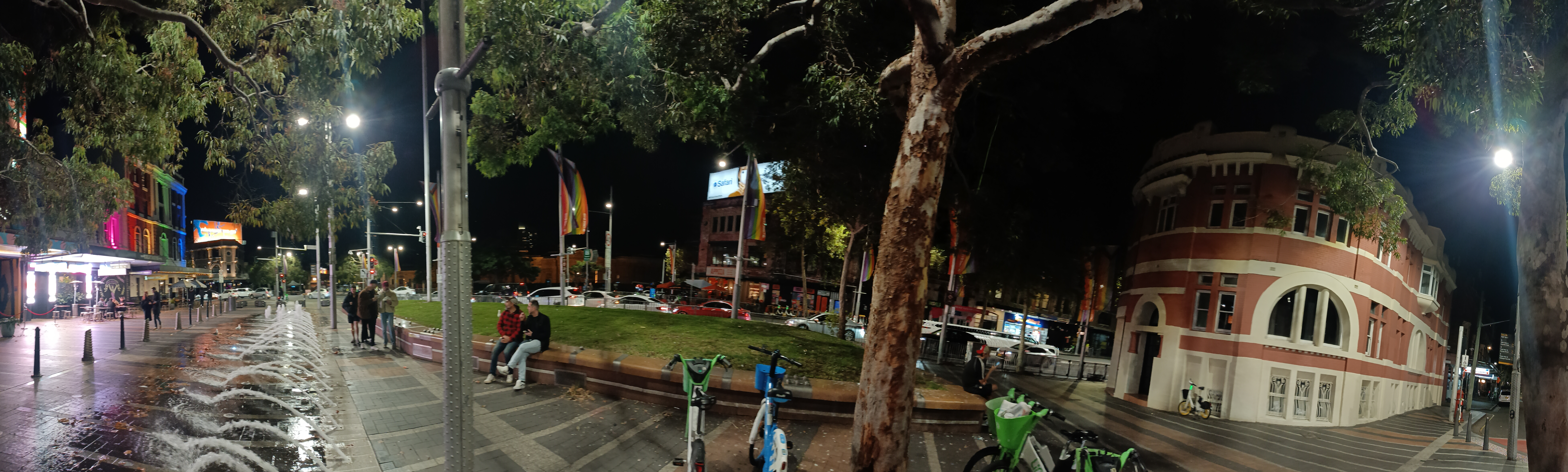
Fountains at Taylor square. 2026

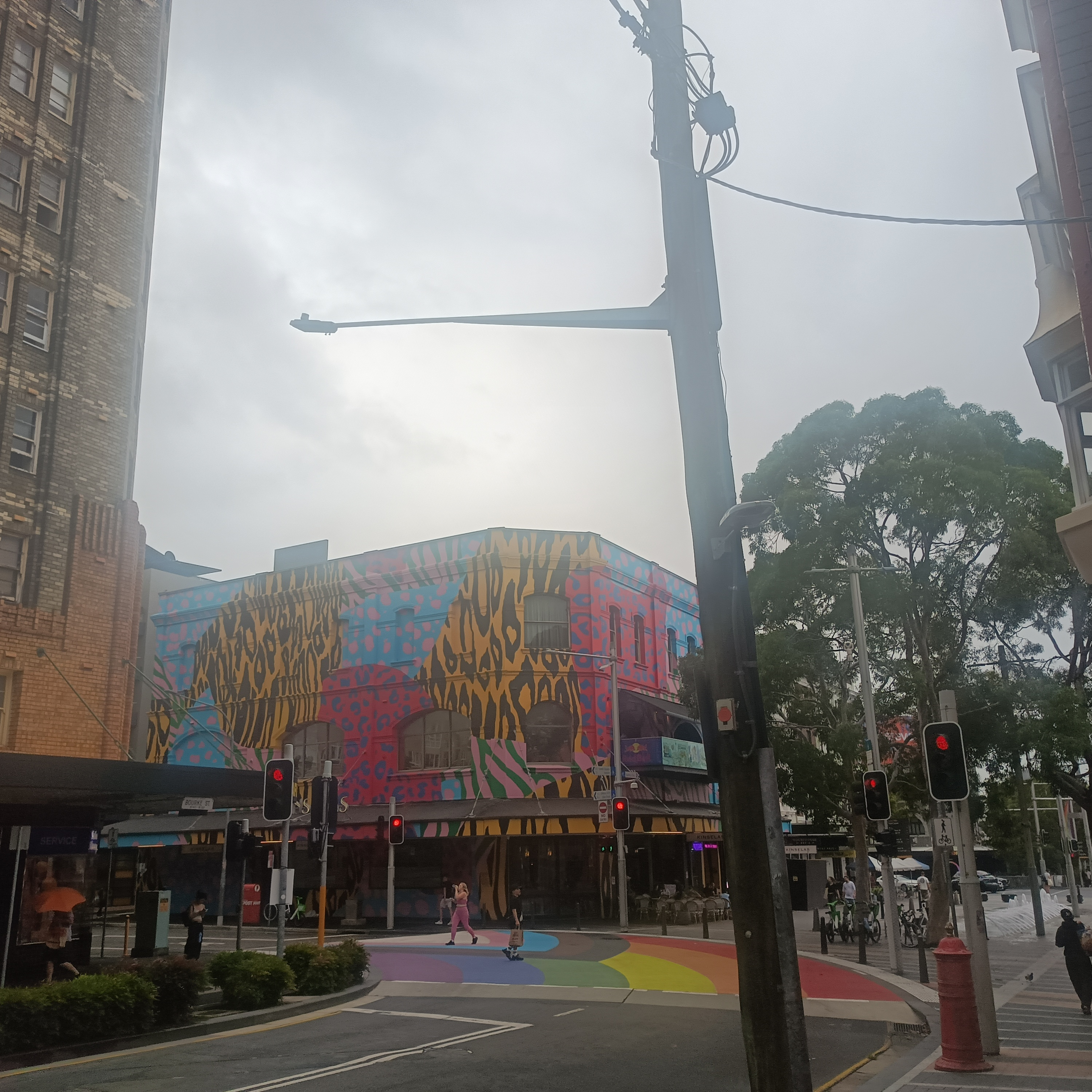
The rainbow crossing at the southern end of Taylor square.

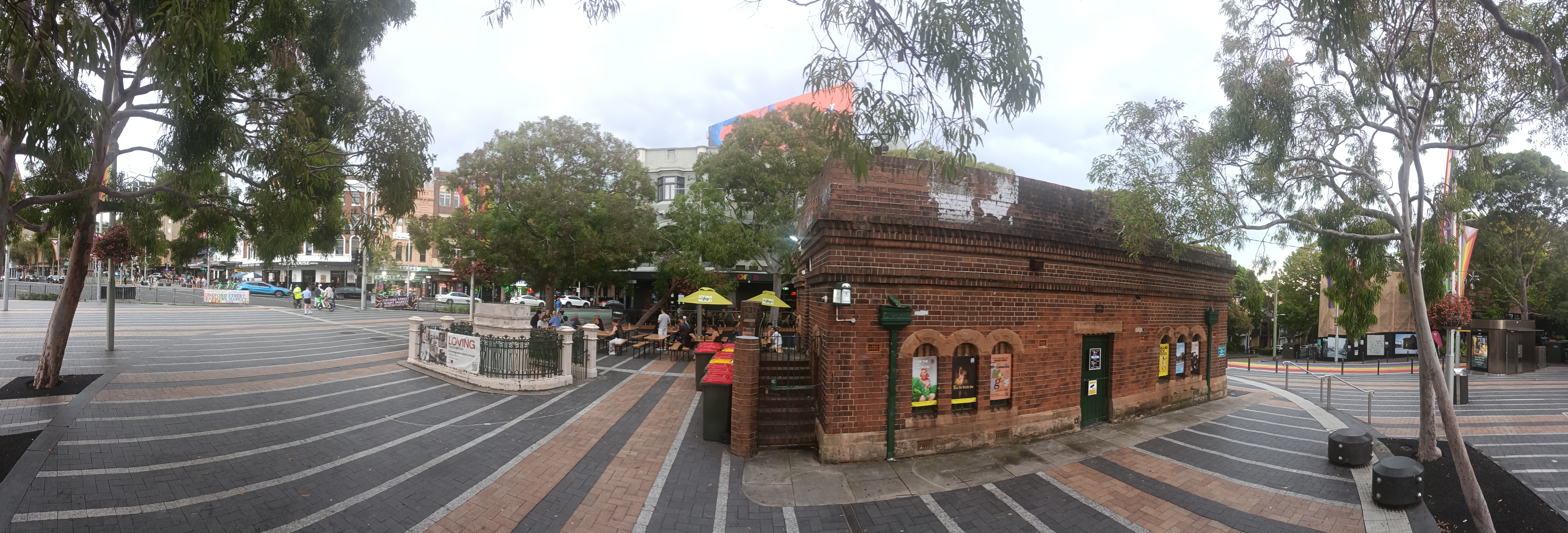
Northern end of Taylor square with the substation and underground toilets which are used by Qtopia as exhibition space.. 2026

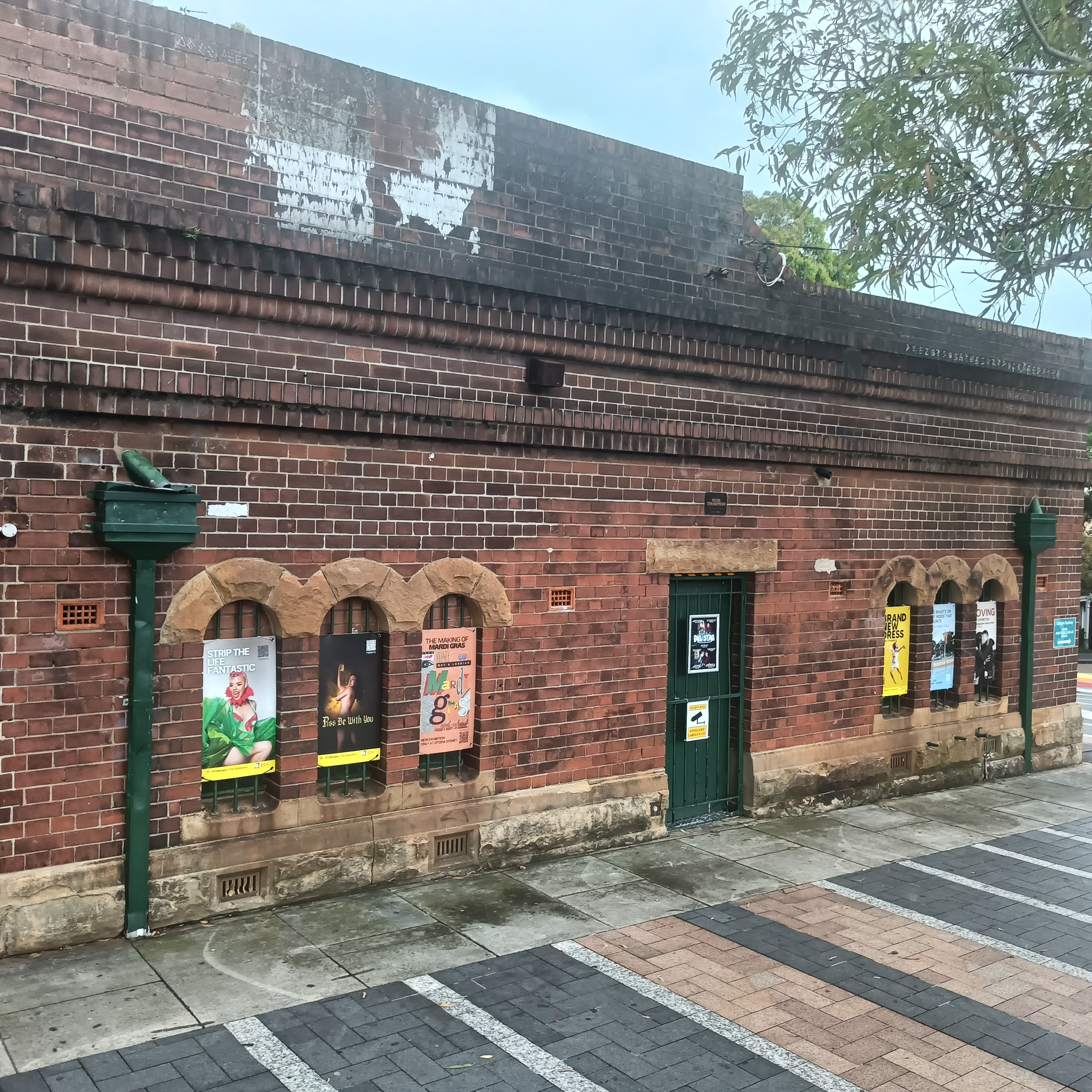
The substation. 2026

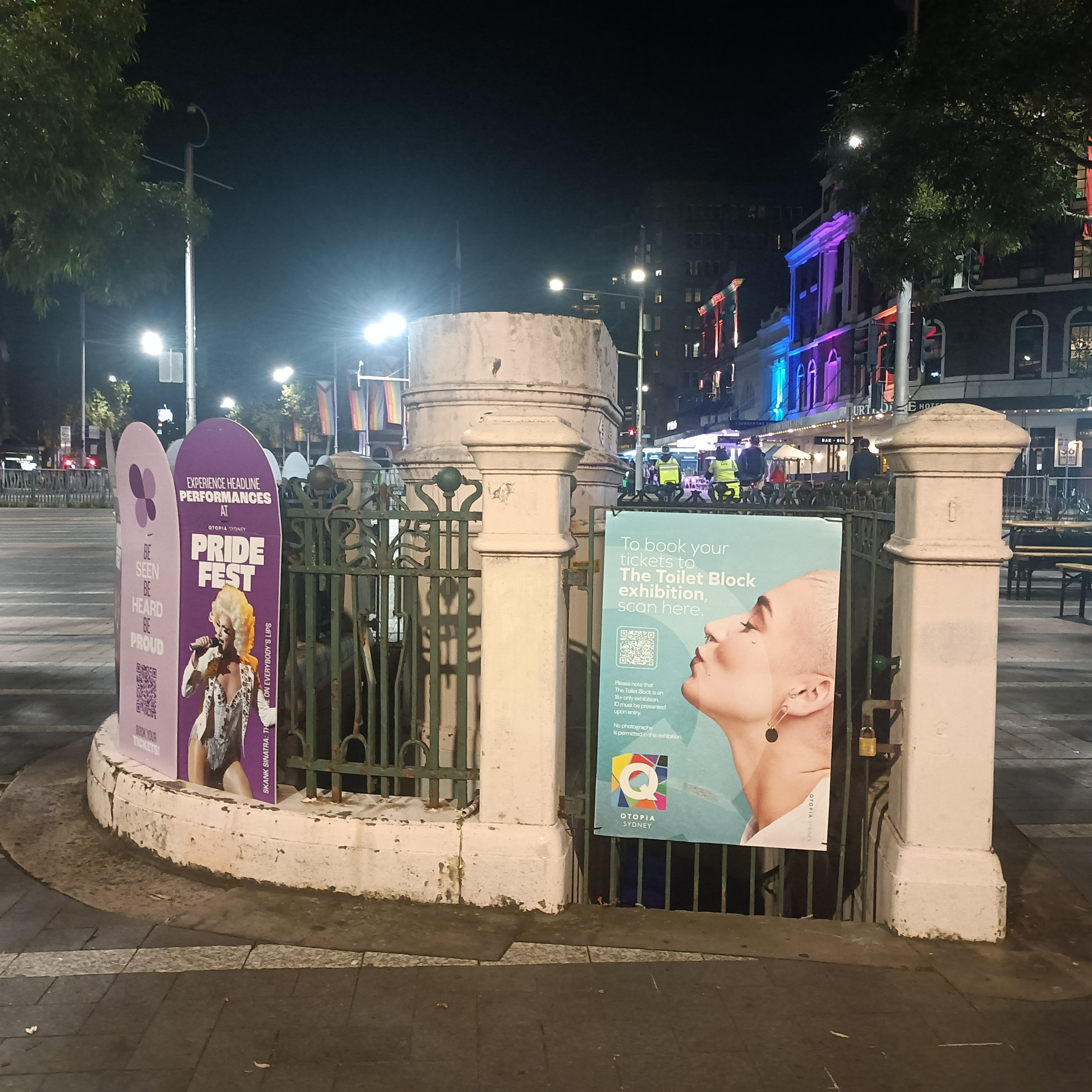
The underground toilets are used by Qtopia as exihbition space. 2025

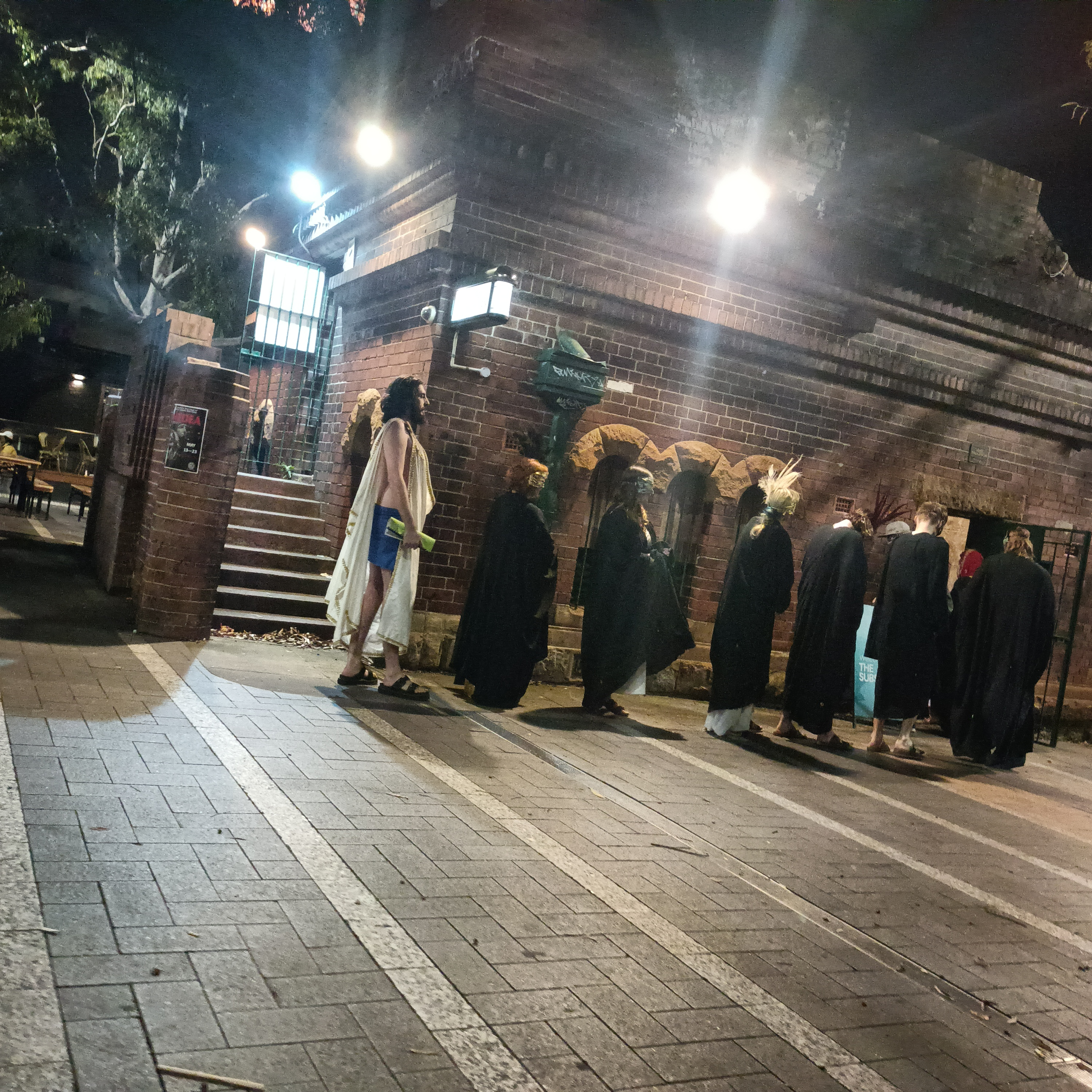
Performers in costumes entering the substation. 2026

== See also ==
- Taylor Square Substation No. 6 and Underground Conveniences
- LGBTQ culture in Sydney
