= Qtopia Sydney =

LGBTQ+ museum in Sydney

Coordinates: 33.8797°S 151.2172°E

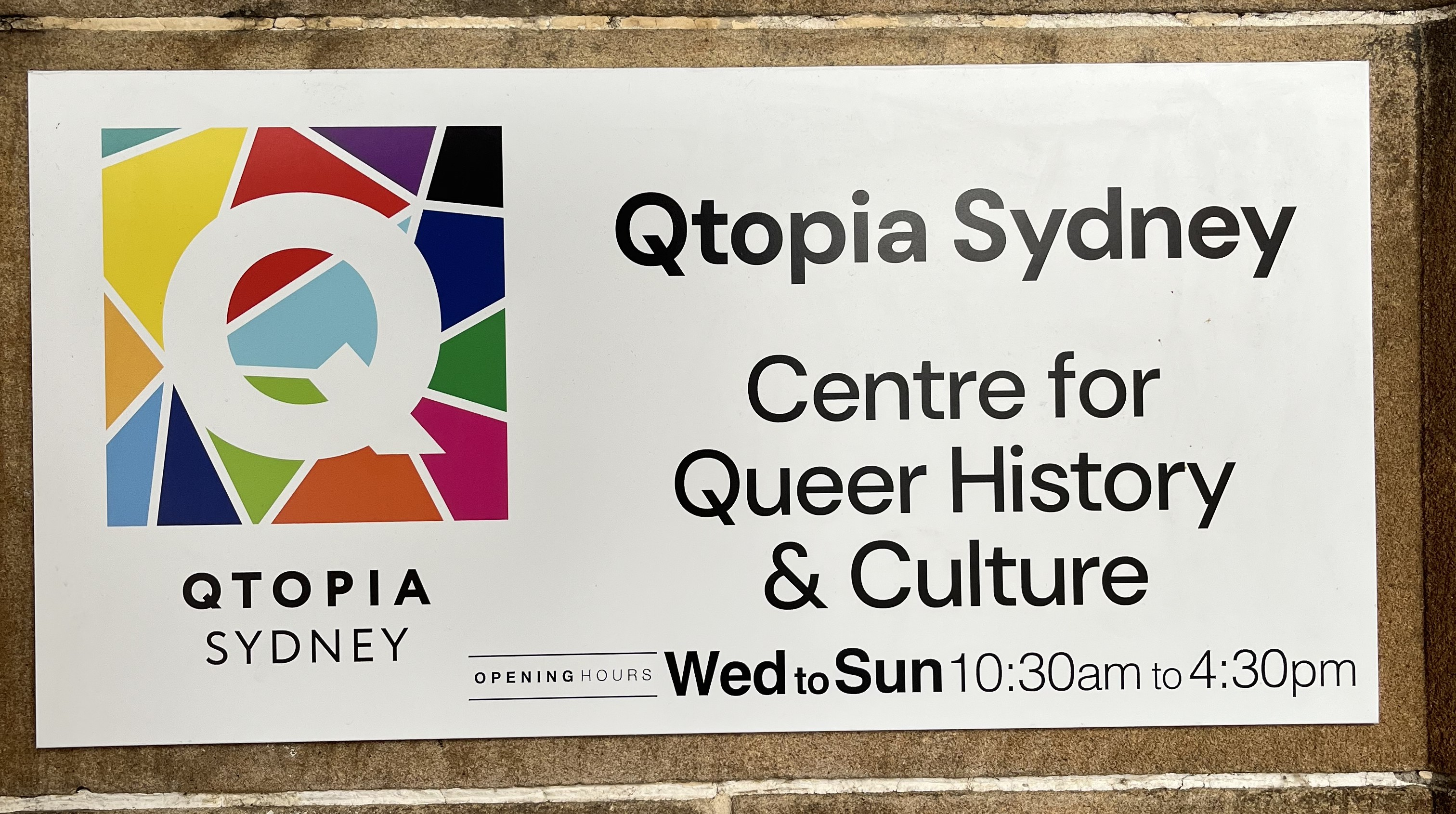
Qtopia Sydney Centre for Queer History & Culture

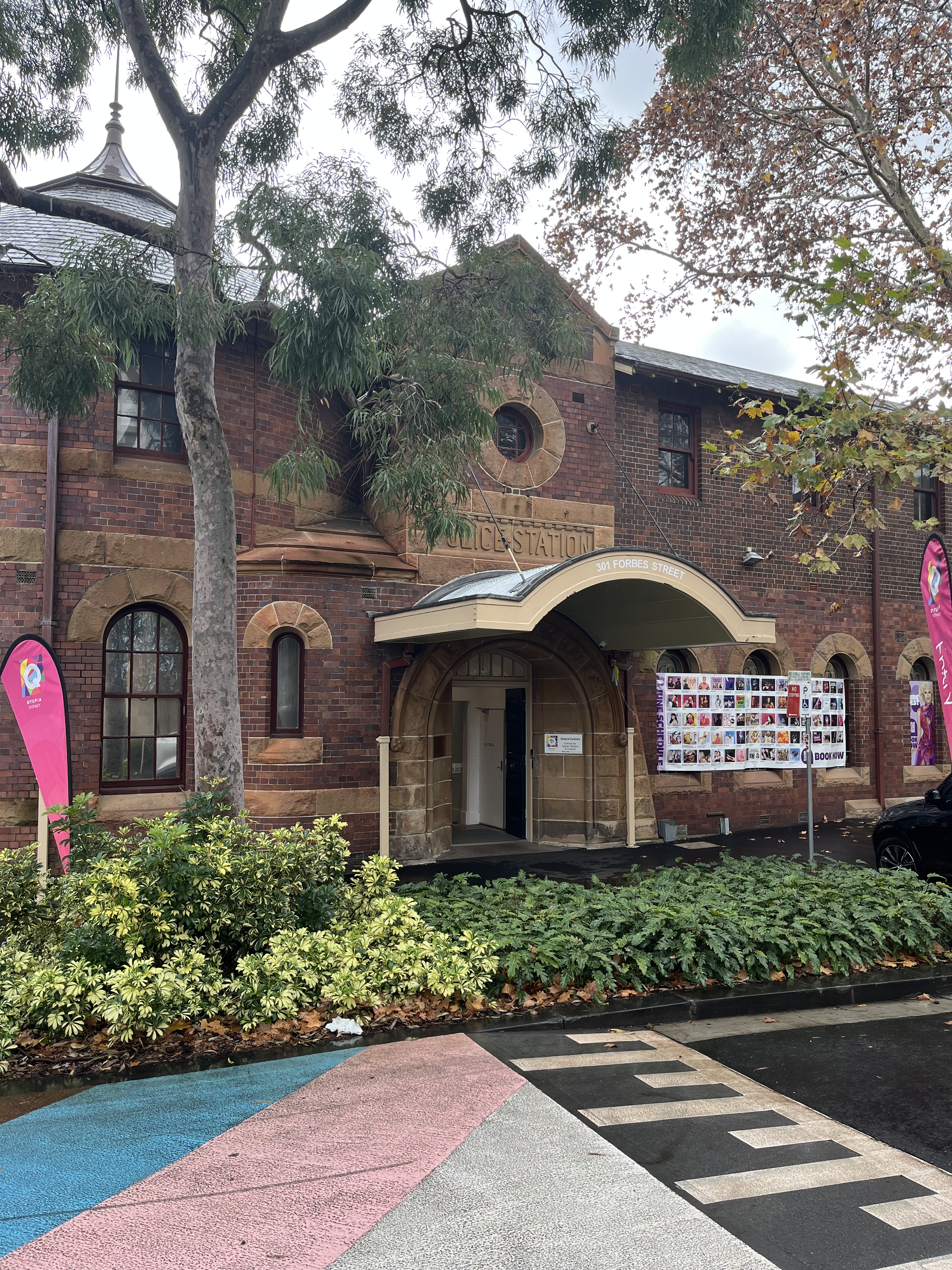
Entrance Qtopia Sydney

Qtopia Sydney is a museum and cultural centre located in Sydney, Australia, dedicated to preserving and celebrating LGBTQIA+ history and culture. It is the largest queer museum in Australia and forms part of a global network of queer museums and archives. Notable institutions in this network include the Leslie-Lohman Museum of Gay and Lesbian Art in New York, Schwule Museum in Berlin, Queer Britain in London, the Queer Museum Vienna, the Tucson Gay Museum in Arizona, and the GLBT Historical Society in San Francisco. It is also associated with archival institutions such as IHLIA LGBTI Heritage in Amsterdam, the ONE National Gay & Lesbian Archives in Los Angeles, the Centrum Schwule Geschichte in Cologne, and the Forum Queeres Archiv München.

== Mission and purpose ==
Qtopia Sydney operates as an educational and cultural institution that advocates for inclusion and combats discrimination. The museum aims to highlight the contributions of the LGBTQIA+ community in Australia, while promoting understanding, learning, and acceptance.

In addition to its exhibitions, the museum functions as a cultural and educational space, offering interactive programs that explore LGBTQIA+ history and contemporary issues. These programs are developed in collaboration with schools and corporate organisations in Sydney.

== History ==
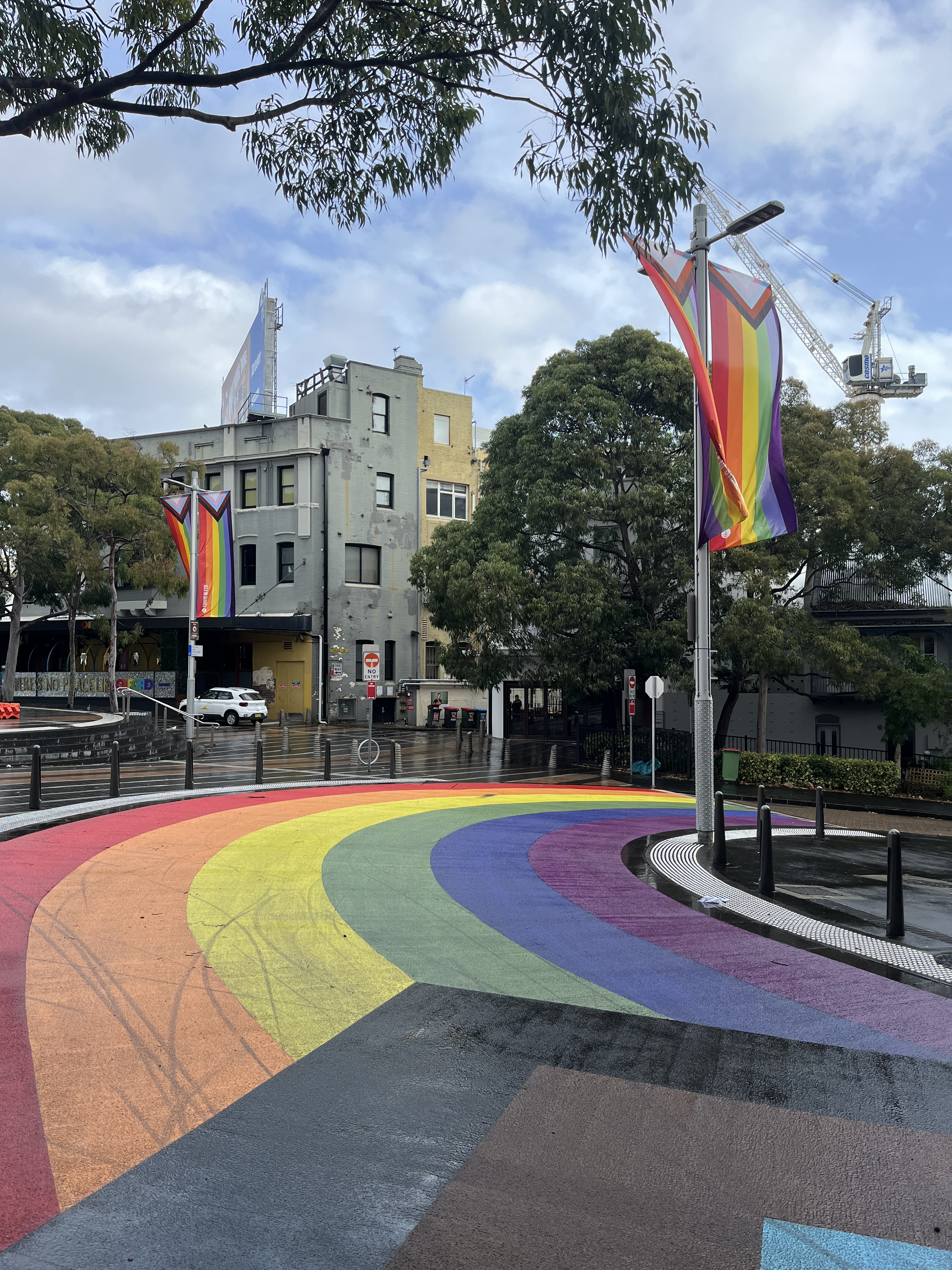
The finished rainbow intersection on Taylor Square in front of Qtopia

The concept for Qtopia Sydney originated in the 1980s with Professor David Cooper, who envisioned a space to honour the lives of those affected by HIV/AIDS. This vision was carried forward by his wife, Dorrie Cooper, and founding member David Polson. Polson, one of the first men diagnosed with HIV/AIDS in Australia, participated in 28 clinical trials under Professor Cooper's care, contributing to significant advancements in HIV treatment.

The initiative gained momentum through the efforts of numerous community members, including the founding committee and board, who were driven by a range of motivations—some aimed to commemorate friends lost to AIDS, suicide, or hate crimes, while others sought to establish a platform for education and awareness.

Qtopia Sydney first opened during Sydney WorldPride in 2023, with a temporary location in Green Park, Darlinghurst, launched by Qtopia Chief Executive Greg Fisher. In 2024, it officially opened its permanent home in the historic Darlinghurst Police Station, located adjacent to the former Darlinghurst Gaol.

On the other side of the former Darlinghurst gaol, just beyond its north-western wall, is the old Darlinghurst police station, a site deeply tainted by its local role in the history of queer persecution. In 2023 the government handed it over to the LGBTQ+ community to be rehabilitated as a museum and community centre under the name Qtopia.

The decision to permanently house the museum in the former Darlinghurst Police Station was met with both support and criticism within the LGBTQIA+ community. Some regarded the building's transfer as a symbolic act of reclamation and reinterpretation, while others expressed deep concern about repurposing a site long associated with systemic police violence against queer individuals—particularly during the 1970s and 1980s. In an open letter to the City of Sydney, representatives from groups such as the Original 78ers, First Mardi Gras, Mature Age Gays, 55 Unity, and the Pride History Group called for broader community consultation and a sensitive approach to the site's legacy. Some survivors of past repression publicly stated that they were unable to enter the building due to traumatic experiences.

Proponents of the location argued that converting the police station into a queer museum could serve as a meaningful act of visibility and healing. The ongoing debate highlights broader tensions between commemoration, urban symbolic politics, and the need for safe and recognised spaces dedicated to queer history and culture.

== Exhibitions and programs ==
Qtopia Sydney presents a diverse range of exhibitions exploring significant aspects of LGBTQIA+ history and culture. These are organised into five main themes: HIV/AIDS, human rights, sexuality and identity, media representation, and First Nations stories—both past and present. As of June 2025, exhibitions include:

- The Apology – Documents the New South Wales Police Force's official apology to the 78ers who participated in the first Sydney Gay and Lesbian Mardi Gras in 1978.
- Crime to Freedom – A historical overview of LGBTQIA+ rights in Australia from the 1970s to the present day.
- HIV/AIDS Memorial – A poignant exhibition featuring personal stories and photographs related to the HIV/AIDS epidemic.
- The Underground – An exploration of cruising culture and queer sexuality in Sydney.
- Lesbians on the Loose – A retrospective examining lesbian representation in Australian media.
- Sydney Star Observer – A visual chronicle documenting 45 years of LGBTQIA+ activism and progress.

In addition to its exhibitions, Qtopia Sydney offers a broad performance program encompassing theatre, comedy, music, and dance.

The museum also delivers a range of educational and community programs, including interactive workshops and facilitated discussions aimed at fostering dialogue, learning, and inclusion.

== Gallery ==
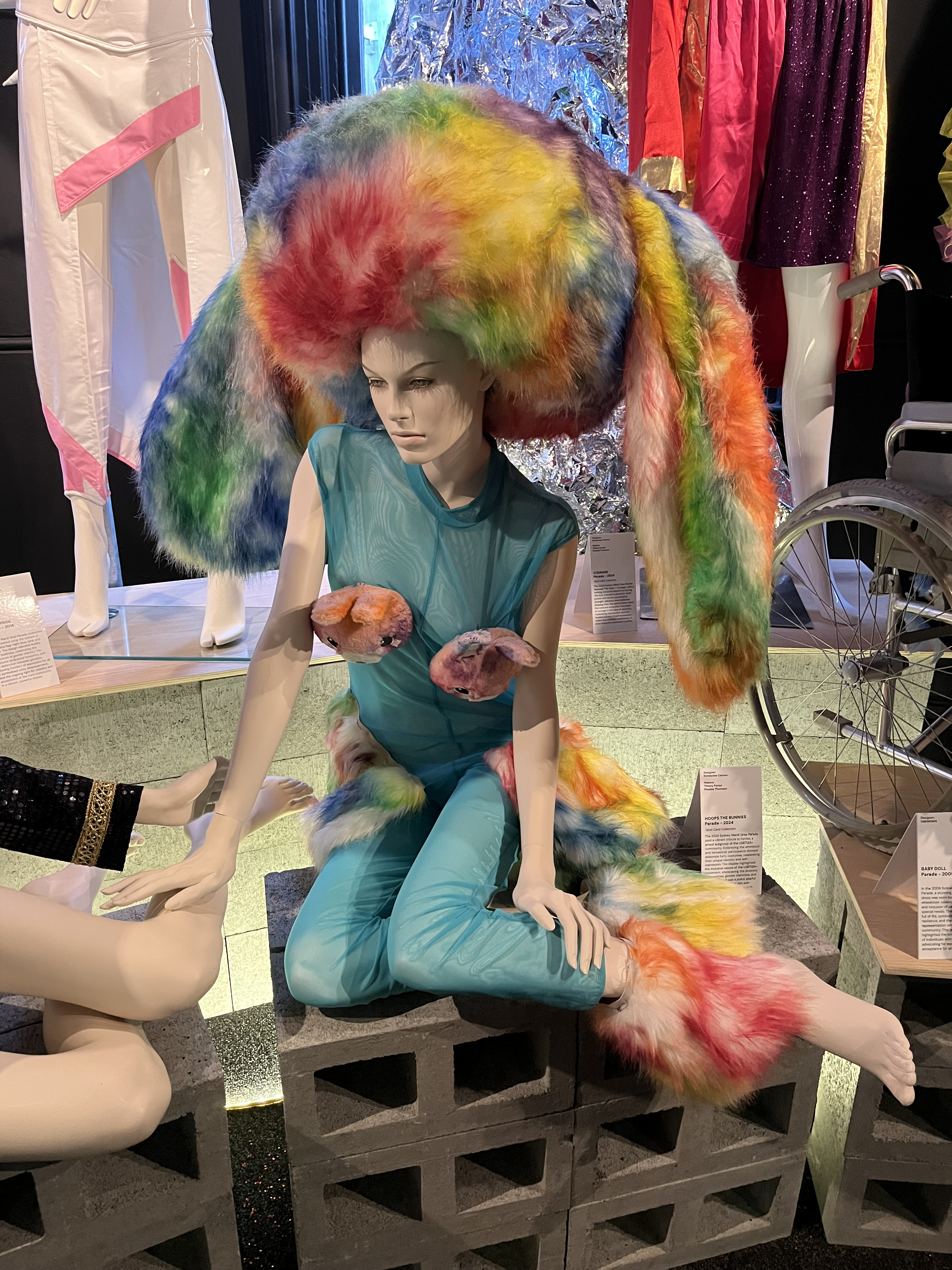
"Hoops the Bunnies" Mardi Gras Parade 2024, Designed by Kimberley Connor. Qtopia

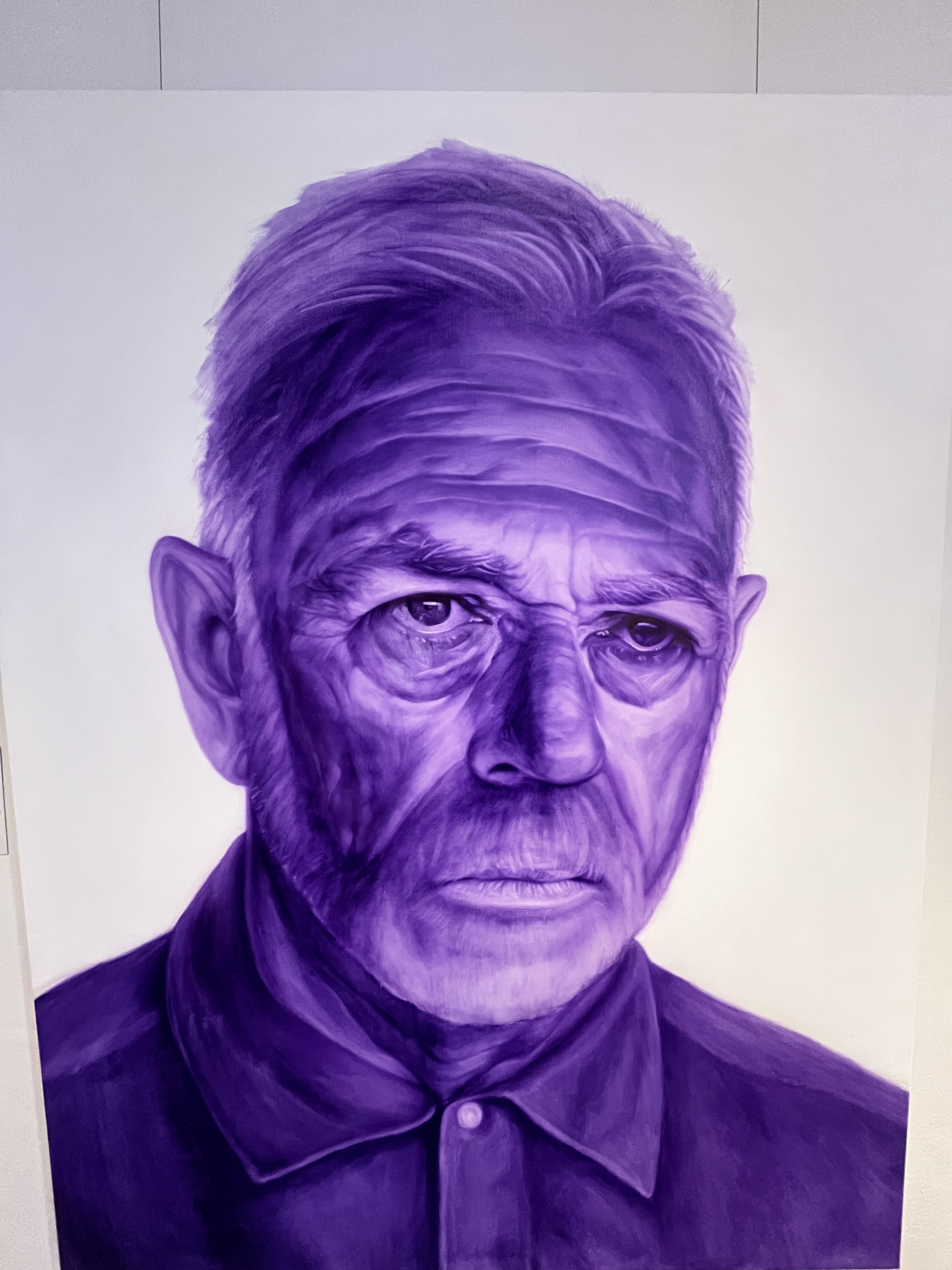
Portrait of David Polson AM painted by Alun Rhys Jones for the 2023 Archibald Prize. Qtopia

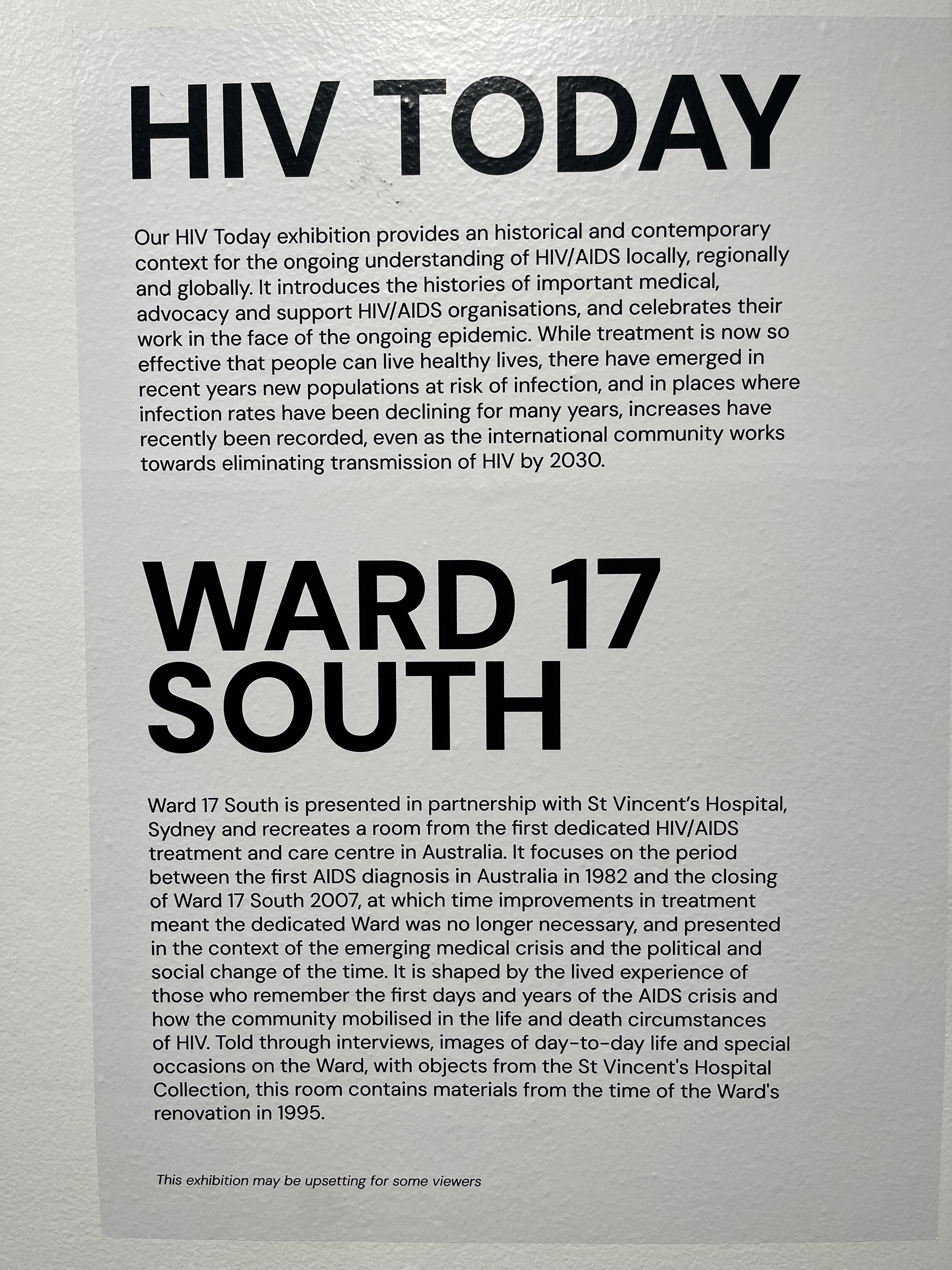
Exhibition Text. Qtopia

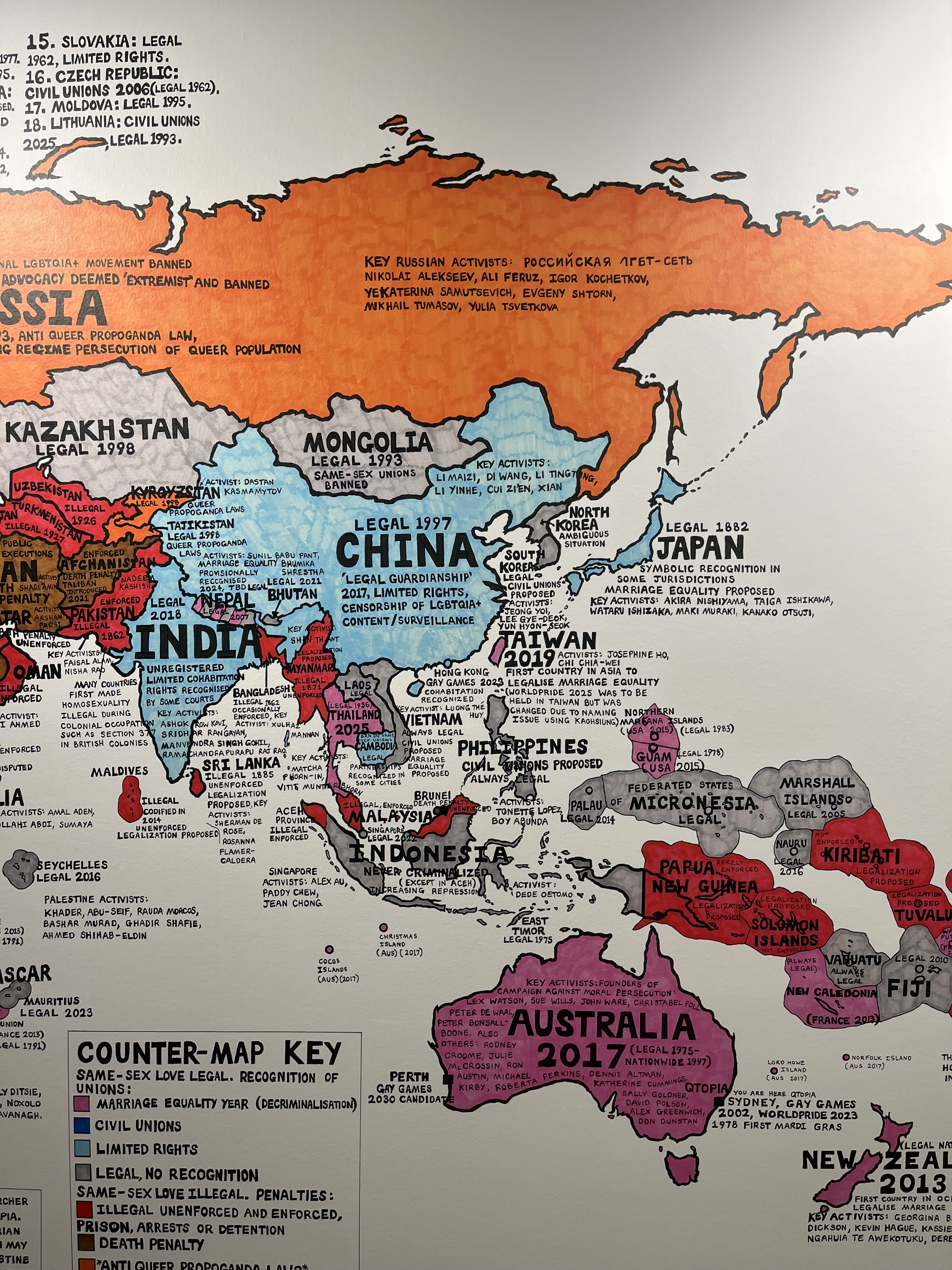
Counter-Map, same-sex love legal. Created by Jeremy Smith 2025. Qtopia

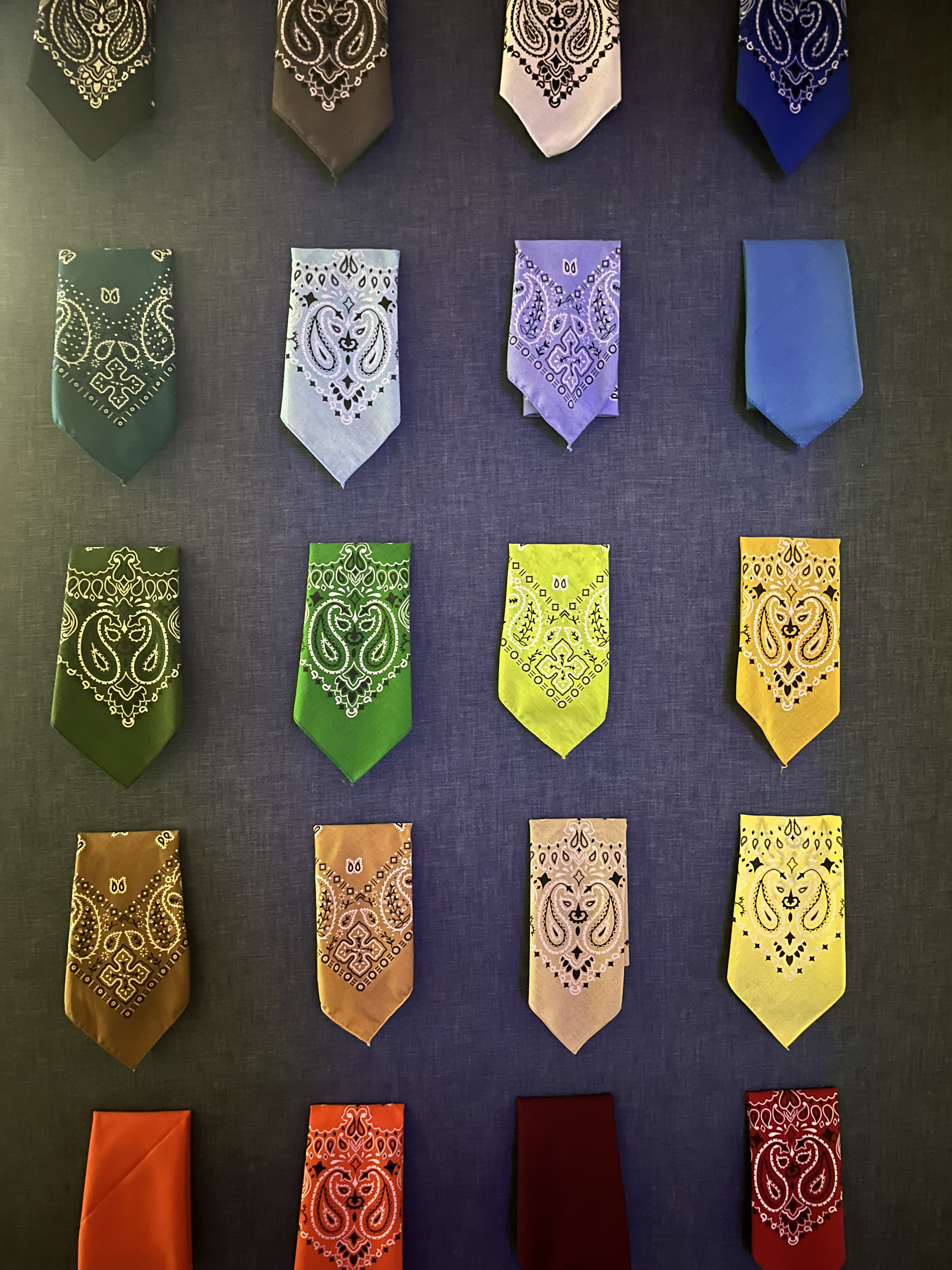
The Hanky Code. Qtopia

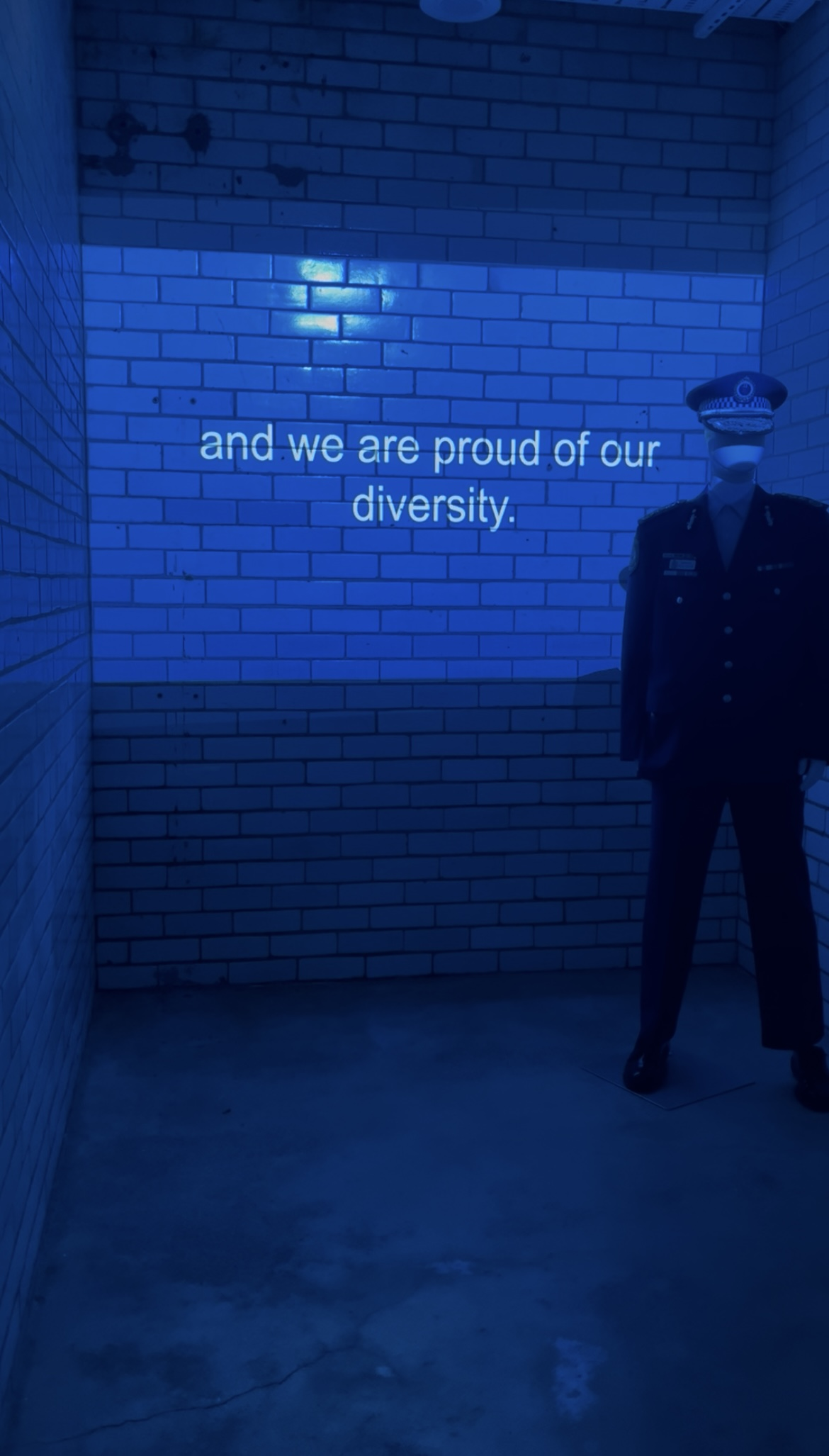
The Apology, Speech by NSW Police Commissioner Mick Fuller from 2018. Qtopia
