= Flamingo Park Frock Salon =

Australian fashion house

Flamingo Park Frock Salon in Strand Arcade, Sydney, was the fashion label and retail outlet established by the creative partnership of Australian artists and designers Jenny Kee and Linda Jackson.

After meeting at an art exhibition opening at the Bonython Gallery in Sydney in 1973, they established their fashion empire which consisted of the 'frock salon' and regular performances of the Flamingo Follies fashion parade.

The salon operated in the Strand Arcade from 1973 until 1992. Clients were invited to 'step into paradise' and an 'explosion of shape and colour'. The Strand Arcade was home to a number of other fashion and beauty shops and Flamingo Park was seen as the 'go to' fashion store by many international visitors including David Bowie, Joni Mitchell, Rudolph Nureyev, Monty Python comic Eric Idle and Mick Jagger. Other high-profile customers included Glenda Jackson, Susannah York, Cheech and Chong, Robert Hughes, Marcia Hines, Kate Fitzpatrick, Jacki Weaver and Alida Chase. Kee was recognised for her innovative designs in knitwear, although the actual hand knitting was carried out by Jan Ayres while Jackson mastered patchwork and applique techniques, favouring tafetta, crêpe de Chine, chiffon and georgette. The duo were adamant that they would maintain the quality of the fashions they produced, so prices consistently matched the amount of work that went into creating their unique designs, and there was no franchising or mass production.

They were an interesting partnership who loved to travel and gathered together the many exotic influences gathered in their travel. They were described as being 'compatible, yet with totally opposite personalities'. Kee was described as 'extroverted and effervescent', while Jackson was seen as 'quiet and ethereal'. They managed to ignore outside influences in their designs and created something that was seen as being uniquely Australian.

In 1977 Flamingo Park won an Australian Lyrebird Award in the creative fashion category of 'The Innovators'. The Flamingo Park duo had created a purple silk taffeta fantasy dress.

In 2018 Kee and Jackson were made Officers of the Order of Australia for their services to Australia's fashion industry.

In 2019, the Powerhouse Museum, Sydney staged the Step Into Paradise exhibition of the designs and fashions of Kee and Jackson and within the exhibition recreated the 're-imagined' salon that had been Flamingo Park.
