= David McDiarmid =

Australian artist and activist (1952–1995)

David Ross McDiarmid (1952–1995) was an artist, designer and political activist, recognised for his prominent and sustained artistic engagement in issues relating to gay male identity and HIV/AIDS. He is also known for his involvement in the gay liberation movement of the early 1970s, when he was the first person arrested at a gay rights protest in Australia, as well as his artistic direction of the Sydney Gay and Lesbian Mardi Gras. From its inception, McDiarmid's art career encompassed, as both subject and inspiration, gay male sexuality, politics and urban subcultures. His creative techniques included: collage, painting, drawing, calligraphy, mosaic, installation, various forms of print-making, sculpture and artist's books. He was a graphic designer, designer and fabric painter for women's and men's fashion, and an artist and creative director for the Sydney Gay and Lesbian Mardi Gras street parades.

== Melbourne ==
Born in Hobart, Tasmania, McDiarmid later moved with his family to Melbourne, where he studied film, art history and illustration at Swinburne College of Technology (now Swinburne University of Technology) between 1969 and 1970. In the early 1970s, McDiarmid joined Melbourne Gay Liberation, later travelling back and forth between Sydney and Melbourne, where he helped found Sydney Gay Liberation in 1972; he also contributed illustrations and articles for their Newsletter and helped edit it. His involvement with Melbourne Gay Liberation included designing an early T-shirt and badge. McDiarmid's involvement with Sydney Gay Liberation, a more radical and protest-driven organisation than the larger gay rights and support group Campaign Against Moral Persecution, or CAMP, led to his involvement in a number of their protests. At one peaceful protest, outside the Australian Broadcasting Corporation (ABC) headquarters on 11 July 1972, against the refusal by ABC management to show a segment on Gay Liberation (that featured Dennis Altman) on This Day Tonight, McDiarmid was arrested, the first such arrest at a gay rights protest in Australia.

In 1973 McDiarmid met the artist and jeweller Peter Tully; they became lovers for the next two years, and remained friends and collaborators until Tully's death in Paris in August 1992.

== Sydney (1975–79) ==
After travelling together through South East Asia in 1974–75, McDiarmid and Peter Tully moved to Sydney in 1975, joining their Melbourne friend and creative collaborator, Linda Jackson, who had moved there with her partner Fran Moore in 1973. This period saw McDiarmid hand-painting fabrics for Jackson's fashion designs. This work was retailed through Jenny Kee's fashion store Flamingo Park in Sydney's Strand Arcade and appeared (between 1975 and 1981) in the annual Flamingo Follies fashion parades held by Jenny Kee and Jackson.

McDiarmid's first one-person exhibition, Secret Love, was held at Hogarth Galleries, Sydney in 1976. The drawings and collages explored gay male life and sexuality, both in and out of the closet. The following year, McDiarmid visited the United States, where he travelled extensively on the east and west coasts between March and October; in particular the gay communities of the Castro in San Francisco and Christopher Street area in Lower Manhattan, New York. His subsequent work was influenced by his embrace of the gay male subcultures of these cities; notably New Works by David McDiarmid at Hogarth Galleries in November 1978 and a portfolio of nine off-setprinted multiples titled Trade Enquiries, issued with Watters Gallery, Sydney, in 1979. Following his return from the US in late 1977, McDiarmid presented an installation called 'An Australian Dream Lounge', exploring the domestic aesthetics of Australian suburbia at Hogarth Galleries, Sydney, in December that year.

The first self-identified group exhibition of Australian gay and lesbian artists, "Homosexual and Lesbian Artists", was held over the weekend of the 23–24 July 1978 at Watters Gallery, Sydney, in association with the Fourth National Homosexual Conference held at Paddington Town Hall in August. The exhibition included a series of McDiarmid's drawings and collage works; he also designed the exhibition poster. Other artists whose work featured in the exhibition included Peter Tully, Sally Colechin, Bill Morley, Tony Robertson, Frances Budden (later Frances Phoenix) and Vivienne Binns. Later in 1978, McDiarmid and Peter Tully jointly created the installation 'The Strine Shrine' at Hogarth Galleries, again referencing the icons of Australian suburbia.

== New York (1979-87) ==
In June 1979, McDiarmid settled in New York, intending to make his life there. The move to New York coincided with the establishment of the black and Hispanic, gay underground dance club Paradise Garage, of which McDiarmid was an early devotee. Paradise Garage served as an inspiration for a suite of work to which McDiarmid gave the title "Disco Kwilts", produced between 1979 and 1981, using newly available material: holographic reflective Mylar sheeting. McDiarmid exhibited in the US, including solo exhibitions at 'Childs/Dreyfus' in Chicago in 1979 and Club Zero in New York in 1983. Throughout his time in New York McDiarmid continued to exhibit back in Sydney and supply painted fabrics to Linda Jackson. One of the first Sydney exhibitions that McDiarmid was involved with following his move to New York was the 'Project 33: Art Clothes' exhibition at the Art Gallery of New South Wales (AGNSW) (1980–1981), curated by Jane de Teliga, which also included works by Linda Jackson, Jenny Kee, Peter Tully, Jenny Bannister, Katie Pye, Bruce Goold and others. McDiarmid was again included in an AGNSW group show in 1981: 'The Harbour Bridge Show'.

In February 1983 McDiarmid exhibited at the Crafts Council of Australia Gallery in Sydney, the catalogue for which, included the following statement by McDiarmid: “I’m interested in popular culture. My work is in the intersection between folk art, women’s art (needlepoint, patchwork quilts) and contemporary materials, I use loud cheap and vulgar plastics to make ‘pretty Pictures’. (1982, n.p.)”.

McDiarmid's work in New York was also influenced by street and subway graffiti. In 1983–84, he produced a series of acrylic paintings on cotton with entwined calligraphy and decorative graphic forms conveying the excitement, exploitation and joy of life in the city: sex, gay rights, cruising, romantic love and the emergence of HIV/AIDS. This work was exhibited in 1984 when he returned to Sydney for the one-person show 'David McDiarmid: New Work' at Roslyn Oxley9 Gallery. That year, McDiarmid was included in another group exhibition, 'The Leather Show', at the Crafts Council Gallery and in 1985, McDiarmid exhibited as part of the group exhibition 'Gay Mardi Gras Exhibition 1985: The Print Source', along with Peter Tully and Allan Booth.

== Sydney (1987–1995) ==
In 1986, still in New York, McDiarmid was diagnosed HIV positive and decided to return to Australia. Back in Sydney McDiarmid devoted himself to producing art which raised awareness of the AIDS epidemic and empowered those who were HIV positive. His influential one-person exhibition focussing on the sexual and cultural politics of AIDS, 'Kiss of Light', was held at the Syme Dodson Gallery, Sydney in 1991. This exhibition inspired the AIDS Council of New South Wales to commission from McDiarmid a series of five safe sex and safe injecting posters which were launched at the Museum of Contemporary Art, Sydney, in April 1992.

Between 1988 and 1992, McDiarmid was variously both artist/designer and artistic director for the Sydney Gay and Lesbian Mardi Gras. He was recognised in this period for his support of lesbian contributions to the culture and design aesthetic of the Mardi Gras parade, party and festival. Among other creative contributions, he designed a large-scale street parade sculpture based on the Mexican Day of the Dead with members of the HIV Living Group for the 1992 Sydney Gay and Lesbian Mardi Gras parade. The graphics from his 1992 Safe Sex posters which were also subsequently enlarged to form gigantic moving figures for the Mardi Gras parade.

In 1993 McDiarmid wrote the illustrated (with 35mm slide transparencies) lecture ‘A Short History of Facial Hair’ tracing his personal, political and sexual history ‘from camp to gay to queer’. This was presented at the Melbourne conference ‘AIDS: Towards a Paradigm’ (and later developed into the digital film "A Short History of Facial Hair" for a London exhibition in 2011).

McDiarmid's 1993 artist's book and photocopied collaged multiples titled ‘Toxic Queen’ focused on the virulent homophobia re-energised by the AIDS epidemic and positioned McDiarmid as a leading queer artist as sensibilities changed from ‘gay to queer’. David McDiarmid was also an accomplished graphic designer designing all the posters for his own exhibitions and those of Peter Tully. He designed posters and print collateral for the Sydney Gay and Lesbian Mardi Gras in 1986, 1988 and 1990, as well as posters for Pride and Sleaze Ball dance parties, AIDS candlelight vigils, World AIDS Day and the ACON safe sex poster series of 1992.

One of the first artists to use digital technology in the production of art, McDiarmid's digital ‘Rainbow Aphorisms’ were a strong presence in the exhibition ‘Don’t Leave Me This Way: Art in the Age of AIDS’ at the National Gallery of Australia, Canberra, curated by Dr Ted Gott in 1994. His numerous group exhibitions through the 1990s also included: 'Pink Summers', Sydney Gay and Lesbian Mardi Gras Festival, (1990); ‘Beauty and the Beast’, Tin Sheds Gallery, The University of Sydney (1991); ‘The Phallus and its Functions’, Ivan Dougherty Gallery, Sydney (1992); ‘Stormy Weather’, national touring exhibition (1992); ‘You Are Here’, Institute of Modern Art, Brisbane, Australian Centre for Contemporary Art, Melbourne and CACSA, Adelaide (1993); ‘The Streets as Art Galleries – Walls Sometimes Speak: Poster Art in Australia’, The National Gallery of Australia, Canberra (1993); ‘Leather Pride Week Exhibition’, The Warehouse, Sydney (1993); ‘Nine Artists’ Barry Stern Gallery, Sydney (1993); ‘The Australian Scarf’, Hyde Park Barracks (1993); ‘Fighting Back: The Art of AIDS Education’, The Drill Hall Gallery, ANU, Canberra (1993); ‘Death’, Ivan Dougherty Gallery (1993); ‘Mardi Gras 1993’, Barry Stern Gallery (1993).

McDiarmid's last group exhibition was ‘Australian Perspecta 1995’, a survey of contemporary art, curated by Judy Annear at the Art Gallery of New South Wales. His huge rainbow ‘Q’ inserted into the tympanum of the gallery's neo-classical façade was McDiarmid's last gesture of “queering the art museum”.

== Legacy (1995-) ==
McDiarmid was conscious of his, and his generation's, artistic and political legacy as many gay artists faced premature death from HIV/AIDS in the 1980s and early 1990s. He became an advocate for effective estate planning for artists, spoke at Sydney Writers Festival on the subject in 1994 and made speaking appearances in association with the Arts Law Centre of Australia. Shocked by the consequences for Peter Tully's creative legacy, following Tully's death in August 1992 without a legal will or an estate plan, McDiarmid asked the curator, Dr Sally Gray, to be his executor and posthumous copyright holder in 1993.

David McDiarmid died of AIDS related conditions on May 25, 1995. From 1996, Gray arranged bequests from the McDiarmid estate to the following public institutions: The National Gallery of Australia, Canberra; The National Gallery of Victoria, Melbourne; Heide Museum of Modern Art, Melbourne; The Art Gallery of New South Wales, Sydney; The Powerhouse Museum of Applied Arts and Sciences, Sydney and several regional galleries in Australia. Gray also arranged for deposit of the artist's personal papers regarding his life and work in The Mitchell Library of The State Library of NSW. As custodian of the artist's creative legacy, Gray has researched, brokered and curated a number of exhibitions of McDiarmid's work including the major retrospective exhibition, ‘David McDiarmid: When This You See Remember Me’, held at the National Gallery of Victoria, Melbourne.

Since 1995, McDiarmid's work has appeared in numerous group exhibitions including: ‘Absolutely Mardi Gras’, Powerhouse Museum, Sydney (1996); ‘Flesh and Blood: Family Connections in Sydney’ (1788-1998, Museum of Sydney (1999); ‘Recent Acquisitions of Australian Art’, National Gallery of Victoria, (1997); ‘Artists and Cartoonists in Black and White’, S H Ervin Gallery, Sydney (1999); ‘Funk de Siecle’, Heide Museum of Modern Art, Melbourne (1999); ‘Desire’, RMIT Gallery (2001); ‘Blondies and Brownies’, Rootkeller, Munich (2001); ‘Dead Gay Artists’, Tin Sheds Gallery, Sydney (2002); ‘Inside Out: Sculpture From the Collection’, Heide Museum of Modern Art (2002); 'Fieldwork' National Gallery of Victoria (2002); ‘With You And Without You: Revisitations of Art in the Age of AIDS’, Ivan Dougherty (2002); ‘Look: New Perspectives on the Contemporary Collection” NGV (2008); ‘Ace Bourke: A Collector’s Journey’, Hazelhurst Gallery, Sydney (2012); ‘Mix Tape 1980s: Appropriation, Subculture, Critical Style’, NGV (2013); ‘Got the Message: 50 years of Political Posters’, Art Gallery of Ballarat (2013); ‘Safe Sex Bang: The Buss Bence Collection, Centre for Sex and Culture, San Francisco (2013); 'David McDiarmid: When This You See Remember Me', National Gallery of Victoria, Melbourne (2014); ‘Cairns Tropical Mardi Gras’, The Tanks, Cairns (2015); 'Art as a Verb', Monash University Museum of Art, Melbourne and Artspace, Sydney (2015); 'Writing Art - The Ideas Platform', Artspace, Sydney (2015); ‘The Patient: The Medical Subject in Contemporary Art’ UNSW Art+Design Gallery and touring nationally (2016–19); ‘Hand and Heart Shall Never Part: The Fashion Collaboration of Linda Jackson and David McDiarmid, Wollongong Art Gallery (2016-17); 'Highlights from the Collection’, Art Gallery of Ballarat (2016); ‘Dissenting Voices’, Art Gallery of Western Australia (2016–17); 'Forty Years of Queer Art', Comber Street Studios, Sydney (2018); 'The Museum of Love and Protest', National Art School, Sydney (2018).

David McDiarmid one-person shows brokered, curated, or co-curated by Dr Sally Gray include: ‘David McDiarmid: A Short History of Facial Hair’, The Fashion Space Gallery, London College of Fashion, University of the Arts, London (2011); ‘David McDiarmid: Rainbow Aphorisms’, Neon Parc, Melbourne (2012); the major retrospective exhibition, 'David McDiarmid: When This You See Remember Me’, National Gallery of Victoria, Melbourne (2014); and ‘David McDiarmid: Toxic Queen’, Neon Parc Melbourne (2016).

David McDiarmid was inducted into the Sydney Gay and Lesbian Mardi Gras ‘Hall of Fame’ in 2000. His life and work also lives on in the work of others: Photographer and performer William Yang's published books, performances and films such as 'Friends of Dorothy' and 'Sadness' pay tribute to the influence of McDiarmid's artistic practice and his political activism. McDiarmid was one of the subjects of composer Lyle Chan's String Quartet: 'An AIDS Activist's Memoir In Music'. The movement called 'Don't Leave Me This Way' memorialises the role the composer played as part of McDiarmid's medical team. This musical movement was performed at the McDiarmid retrospective at the National Gallery of Victoria in July 2014, preceded by a forty-minute conversation between the composer and the former Judge of the High Court of Australia the Hon. Michael Kirby.

In 2017-18 McDiarmid's ‘Rainbow Aphorisms’ appeared throughout the London Underground transport network as part of ‘Art on the Underground’. The project was initiated by Studio Voltaire London and Dr Sally Gray for the McDiarmid estate. The project also included display of McDiarmid's ‘Rainbow Aphorisms’ in public spaces in Clapham, South London.
