= Doris Fish =

Australian drag queen (1952–1991)

- Doris Fish in Vegas In Space 1991
- Born: Philip Clargo Mills; 11 August 1952; Sydney, Australia
- Died: 22 June 1991 (aged 38); San Francisco, California, United States
- Other name: Philip Clargo Mills
- Occupations: Artist; actor; writer; performer
- Years active: 1972–91

Doris Fish (born Philip Clargo Mills; 11 August 1952 – 22 June 1991) was a drag queen, artist, actor and writer, based in Sydney, Australia, and San Francisco, California, United States. As Doris Fish, Mills wrote and starred in the cult movie classic Vegas in Space.

== Early life ==
Philip Clargo Mills was born in Sydney on 11 August 1952, the middle child of six in a Catholic family that allowed a marijuana plant on its property. He grew up in the suburb of Manly Vale.

== Career ==
=== Sydney ===
Mills began performing using the stage name Doris Fish in Sydney in 1972 as one of the three core performers of the political drag group Sylvia and the Synthetics (1972–1974), along with Miss Abood (Danny Abood, Daniel Archer) and Jacqueline Hyde. In 1975 Mills visited San Francisco for the first time on holiday, before moving there permanently the following year.

Doris regularly returned to Sydney, Australia in the late 1970s, compering shows for Cabaret conspiracy, performing in the Sydney Gay Theatre Group's production of Noel Greig's As Time Goes By (1979), or performing at venues such as Garibaldi's along with the Doreens.

During 1978–1979 Mills as Doris was also the American West-Coast Correspondent for Campaign, a national gay and lesbian newspaper in Australia. With the development of the Sydney Gay Mardi Gras Workshop by Peter Tully in 1983, Mills would return annually to volunteer in the Workshop building community floats and creating costumes for Doris' individual and group floats. Doris also continued to host events, including the first Mardi Gras Awards at Kinselas in 1987.

=== San Francisco ===
In 1976 at an audition for the rock group The Tubes, he met fellow drag queen Tippi, and they became roommates. In 1977 San Francisco gay leaders urged no drag on Gay Freedom Day. Doris and many other drag queens turned out in force. Also in 1977, Doris was cast in the James Moss directed feature-length film Magazine movie, a magazine format film about San Francisco, playing herself, "a fake woman from Australia who has won the heart of San Francisco".

At a come-as-your-favorite-Fellini-character party in 1979, Mills met Miss X who wasn't yet serious about doing drag, but by the end of the year Doris Fish, Tippi and Miss X were performing as Sluts-A-Go-Go.

Throughout the 1980s Doris Fish was one of the more prominent drag queens in San Francisco. On stage, Doris Fish performed for over 10 years in San Francisco with Miss X and Tippi as Sluts A-Go-Go.

Sluts A-Go-Go performed in venues like Club 181 with shows such as Marc Huestis' Naked Brunch series and the Phillip R. Ford Happy Hour series culminating in Nightclub of the Living Dead, along with other performers such as Sandelle Hebert and Tommy Pace. In 1986, Doris and Tippi did a weekly cable news show about the gay community, although some viewers complained that Doris was a negative stereotype.

As a visual artist, Mills painted hyper-realistic canvases depicting drag queens, although he once said "If I could, I would paint my eyeballs".

== Death and legacy ==
Mills died from complications from AIDS in San Francisco in 1991.

Mills' major legacy is the cult camp classic film Vegas in Space, which he co-wrote and starred in with Phillip Ford.

Australian Queer Archives holds material relating to Doris Fish.

== Recognition ==
The life of Philip Mills as Doris featured in the one-act play Simply Stunning: The Doris Fish Story, which was performed at the Theatre Rhinoceros Studio in San Francisco in September 2002. The script was adapted by Phillip R. Ford from biographical remarks Fish made in stage shows and in the column Fish wrote for the gay newspaper The Sentinel in the late 1980s. Ford (who also directed Mills' movie Vegas in Space) directed the play, which starred Arturo Galster.

In 2002, artworks by Doris were included in the exhibition Dead Gay Artists at the Tin Sheds, University of Sydney, curated by Robert Lake. The exhibition also included the works of fellow artists Doug Erskine, Eddy Hackenberg, Jasper Havoc, Brad Levido, David McDiarmid, Brenton Heath Kerr and Peter Tully.

In 2023, a biography of Mills by Craig Seligman was published, called Who does that bitch think she is? Doris Fish and the Rise of Drag. The book highlights Mills' time flourishing as drag queen Doris Fish in AIDS-era San Francisco. It was reviewed in The New York Times.
