= Arthur Frederick Dicks =

Australian actor and theater designer (1935–1994)

Arthur Frederick Dicks (1935–1994) was a designer working in the field of theatre and dance, as well as an accomplished actor and artist. He became the first head of design at the National Institute of Dramatic Art in Australia.

Born in London, Dicks lived through the Blitz, and was eventually rehoused in the country when his home was destroyed. In his teens he became involved in repertory theatre and acted with Laurence Olivier and Judi Dench; he stayed in contact with some of these actors for the rest of his life. As well as working on his drama skills, he began work as an artist for a prestigious advertising agency.

He decided to travel in his twenties and ended up in New York City, where he went to work for a leading fashion magazine. An assignment in Louisiana in 1951 led to his taking a yearlong break in New Orleans, living in the Pontalba Apartments and a friend's plantation house at White Castle, where he began a series of travel painted diaries.

By the mid-1950s he was back in London, where he signed up with the Royal Air Force (RAF). He was assigned to bomb disposal and sent to Iraq. Again he did many detailed drawings and photos of his travels.

After the RAF, Dicks returned to London, where he married and returned to the theatre. He trained in theatre design at the Central School of Drama, London, and worked at repertory companies in Britain. Both he and his wife acted all over the United Kingdom. They also had a daughter. He often not only acted but was involved in designing the sets and costumes. This new direction saw him working as a set and costume designer in England, the United States and Africa, spending some time in Nairobi.

By the mid-1960s Dicks arrived in Hollywood with introductions to David Niven and the English set of actors. He quickly started work with designer Bill Travilla and liaised with Edith Head on two productions as well. By now he had two daughters, but his wife and children returned to London. He was head of design at New Theatre Royal Lincoln when he was asked to come to Australia.

== National Institute of Dramatic Art ==
He was asked to come to Australia to become the head of design at the National Institute of Dramatic Art (NIDA) in 1972, a position he held for years. His students include Peter Cooke (1974), who is now deputy director and head of design, NIDA, and Eamon D'Arcy (1976), who is now exhibition curator and designer of "A Slap Up Treat: Travelling Shakespeare in Australia". Mel Gibson, Cate Blanchett and Nicole Kidman all came from the strong acting base of NIDA. Angus Strathie, one of Dicks's students, went on to win an Oscar for Moulin Rouge!.

== Q Theatre, Penrith ==
He later became involved with the Q Theatre, Penrith, and was one of its artistic directors with Doreen Warburton and Richard Brooks and designer up until they resigned in 1989. He designed a production of The Devil's Disciple, directed by Doreen Warburton at the Sydney Opera House. This was the first play directed by a woman for the Sydney Theatre Company. He personally funded playreadings of young playwrights to get them seen and produced.

== Last years ==
He directed Pippin (1984) and Camelot (1991) for Gosford Musical Society. During the last years of his life Dicks promoted new plays every year during Sydney's Mardi Gras Festival. In 1991 he formed a company with actor-writer Gae Anderson and actor-director Paul Hastings Booth. Through his personal endeavours and commitment many new plays, actors and writers were showcased in his productions. This later became the nucleus of the "In the Pink Theatre Company". He designed the play Nothing Personal, directed by Paul Hastings Booth for the "In The Pink Theatre Company" in February 1993. His last work was directing Look Back in Anger at the Lookout Theatre, Woollahra, New South Wales, which opened 3 August 1993.

Arthur died on 13 December 1994 at the Royal Prince Alfred Hospital after a prolonged illness. He was greatly missed by the theatre and arts community of Sydney. His funeral was attended by notable theatre celebrities and his obituary was published in all Australian press.

== Bibliography ==
- Angela Bennie, "He Brought Theatre to the People. Arthur Dicks 1935–1994. Obituary" Sydney Morning Herald 16 December 1994 p. 17.
- Barry Lowe, "Arthur Dicks 1935–1994. Obituary" Sydney Star Observer 28 December 1994 p. 14.
- A. Street, "From Baghdad to Penrith, nothing's impossible for Arthur." Campaign 28 February 1981 p. 34.
- Arthur Dicks, "Designing Mind: A view of the stage by the Q's head of design, Arthur Dicks." Q THEATRE 84: 1963–1984. Penrith: Q Theatre 1985
