= Sydney Gay and Lesbian Mardi Gras =

Annual LGBTQIA+ pride event in Australia

Coordinates: 33.88068°S 151.21719°E

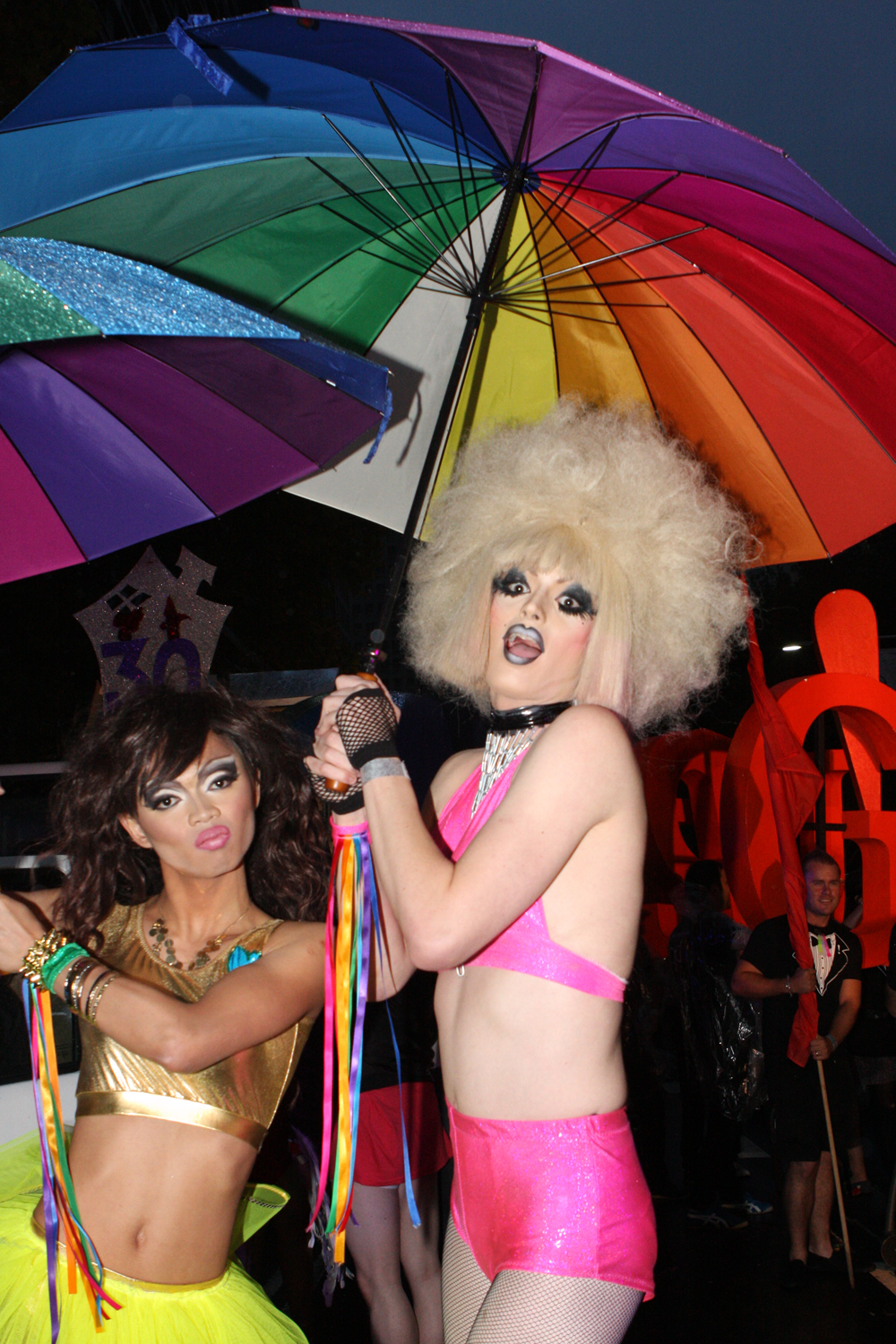
- Participants in 2012
- Genre: LGBTQ pride parade and festival
- Begins: Second Thursday in February
- Ends: First Saturday in March
- Frequency: Annually
- Locations: Sydney, New South Wales, Australia
- Years active: 48
- Inaugurated: 24 June 1978
- Most recent: 1 March 2025
- Participants: 16,500 (Parade 2019); 13,626 (Party 2019)
- Attendance: 500,000 (Parade 2019); 80,000 (Fair Day 2019)
- Website: www.mardigras.org.au

The Sydney Gay and Lesbian Mardi Gras is an annual pride parade in Sydney, New South Wales attended by hundreds of thousands of people from around Australia and overseas. Mardi Gras is the largest gay and lesbian event in Oceania. It first began as a protest for gay and lesbian people in 1978. In 2019, an attempt was made to alter the name to include more groups under the queer umbrella, but this was voted down by the gay and lesbian members, who wanted the event to remain exclusive. This decision was met by disappointment from especially bisexual Australians, who consider it a form of Bisexual erasure.

The Sydney Gay & Lesbian Mardi Gras is one of Australia's biggest tourist drawcards, with the parade and dance party attracting many international and domestic tourists. It is New South Wales' second-largest annual event in terms of economic impact, generating an annual income of about A$30 million for the state.

Since the mid 1990's the parade has had an average of around 200,000 to 250,000 people viewing it along the parade route with around 150 to 180 floats and around 10,000 to 12,000 participants in the parade each year. The entire Mardi Gras festival, which runs for around 2 to 3 weeks in conjunction with the parade each year, has around 30,000 visitors who travel from outside Sydney to attend each year. In 2023 when Sydney also hosted Sydney WorldPride the Mardi Gras festival had 310,000, people attend its events, which included large scale events such as the WorldPride opening ceremony in the Domain, Fair Day, the Mardi Gras after party and Bondi Beach party. In 2023 there were also 103,800 people who visited Sydney for the festival and 21,000 of those people were international visitors.

The event has grown from gay rights parades that were held annually since 1978, when numerous participants were arrested by New South Wales Police Force. The Mardi Gras Parade maintains a political flavour, with many marching groups and floats promoting gay and lesbian rights issues or themes. Reflecting changes since the first Sydney Gay & Lesbian Mardi Gras, participants in the Mardi Gras Parade now include groups of uniformed Australian Defence Force personnel, police officers from New South Wales Police Force, as well as interstate and federal police officers, firefighters and other emergency services personnel. However, this remains a controversial topic among the community, with many objecting to the inclusion of police. Marriage equality was a dominant theme in the 2011 Sydney Gay & Lesbian Mardi Gras Parade with at least 15 floats lobbying for same-sex marriage.

Since 2009, the NSW government Labor and Liberal have both given funding to The Sydney Gay and Lesbian Mardi Gras.

In 2019 Sydney Gay & Lesbian Mardi Gras submitted a bid to host WorldPride 2023 competing against Montreal, Canada and Houston, Texas. InterPride chose Sydney, Australia to host WorldPride 2023 at their Athens October 2019 Annual General Meeting of three hundred delegate organizations, the first time WorldPride was held in the Southern Hemisphere or Asia Pacific region.

== History ==
=== The term Mardi Gras ===
The Sydney Gay and Lesbian Mardi Gras, or Sydney Mardi Gras, is a celebration of gay and lesbian history and culture. It was named after, but is unrelated to, the Christian holiday of Mardi Gras.

When the first event was organised in 1978, it was conceived as a street party in an effort to host a more "positive celebration"; the term Mardi Gras had become synonymous with street festivals and so became the name for the event. Mardi Gras derives from the celebrations held on Mardi (French for "Tuesday") when Gras (French for "fat") is eaten prior to the Christian abstinence period of Lent preceding Easter.

=== 1971 to 1973 ===
The first LGBTQIA+ demonstration in Australia was organised by CAMP (Campaign Against Moral Persecution) and occurred on the 6th of October 1971. CAMP, which had first been established in 1970, organised the protest to take place outside the Liberal Party’s Sydney headquarters in the Sydney CBD and around 70 people turned up to protest in support of Tom Hughes, a pre-selection candidate who supported homosexual law reform.

Following this first demonstration in October 1971, CAMP continued to participate in further demonstrations for law reform challenging discrimination against the LGBTQIA+ community.

In July 1973 another LGBTQIA+ group, Sydney's Gay Liberation, came up with the idea for a Gay Pride festival to be held over one week in Sydney and they spoke about their ideas for the festival in their August 1973 issue of the Sydney Gay Liberation newsletter and after contacting groups in Melbourne, Brisbane, and Adelaide similar LGBTQIA+ festivals also occurred in these cities. The festival in Sydney took place in September, and it included a festival in the Domain, a public meeting and a speak out. The final event at the end of the week was a demonstration which included about 200 LGBTQIA+ people who marched from Sydney Town Hall to Martin Place and the 200 participants held black and pink balloons, banners and streamers and yelled out chants including "Out of the beats and onto the streets" and a total of 18 people were charged for taking part in the demonstration.

It has been commented that " ...the events of 1973, with its melding of pride and politics, formed the model on which Mardi Gras and similar pride festivals around Australia are based."

=== 1978 to 1979 ===
Participants in the first Sydney Gay and Lesbian Mardi Gras standing on the back of the sound truck during the night time celebration that was held in June 1978. As the sound truck and the march made its way down Oxford st, Darlinghurst toward Hyde park the size of the crowd increased to 1,500 as people came out of bars and clubs and joined in.

The first Sydney Gay and Lesbian Mardi Gras occurred on the 24 June 1978 and it consisted of a series of events that called for an end to discrimination against homosexuals in employment and housing, an end to police harassment and the repeal of all anti-homosexual laws and these events included a morning protest march in commemoration of the Stonewall riots as part of a global network of Gay Solidarity events as well as a night-time celebration that began on Oxford street in Darlinghurst.

Ken Davis one of the organisers and participants in these events has described what occurred on that day as follows "We sought and received police permission and hired a modest sound truck. Press publicity for gay liberation and the planned Mardi Gras was prominent in the campus and socialist newspapers, and in the then-progressive Australian. The organisers relied on letters to groups, phone calls, posters, leaflets and word-of-mouth. The Saturday morning march from Town Hall to Martin Place with 500 people was larger than any previous gay protest in Australia... ...By 10.30 pm, outside the court at Taylor Square on a cold night, we were unsure if we could get critical mass for our experiment in celebration, but eventually we set off with the small sound truck..." and as the group marched down Oxford street towards Hyde Park, the number of people rose to around 1,500 as revellers in Oxford Street bars and clubs responded to the call "Out of the bars and into the streets!".

Ken Davis further comments that "...Apart from the truck, there were no typical protest placards or banners. Only a small percentage of participants were dressed in carnival costumes..." and then "...the police decided to not observe the permit... ...The police pushed the parade fast down Oxford Street and arrested Lance Gowland, the driver of the sound truck, to prevent the planned dispersal into Hyde Park, so the 1500-strong crowd spontaneously marched down College Street and up William Street to Kings Cross. By the time the crowd was dispersing near El Alamein Fountain..." in Kings Cross 53 people were arrested. Two people who were arrested were fined. The rest were released without bail and the charges dismissed.

Although most charges were eventually dropped, The Sydney Morning Herald published the names of those arrested in full, leading to many people being outed to their friends and places of employment and many of those arrested lost their jobs as homosexuality was a crime in New South Wales until 1984.

The police response to a legal, local minority protest transformed it into a nationally significant event which stimulated gay rights and law reform campaigns and it has been commented by Ken Davis that "...the first gay Mardi Gras... ...on Saturday 24 June 1978 was a pivotal moment... ...Though there had been gay and lesbian groups and protests after 1970, for the first time gay and lesbian rights became a significant public issue, creating a momentum for reforms."

A documentary, Witches and Faggots, Dykes and Poofters, produced by Digby Duncan in 1980 tells the story of the first Sydney Gay and Lesbian Mardi Gras and in 2018 a restored version of the documentary was screened at the 25th Mardi Gras Film Festival in Sydney, Brisbane's Queer Film Festival and at the National Film and Sound Archive's Arc cinema in Canberra.

The second Mardi Gras Parade occurred the following year in 1979 despite receiving opposition from gay media, businesses and groups and it again recognised the Stonewall Riots of 1969 as well as commemorating the first mardi gras the previous year. It had the theme of Power in the Darkness and there were 3,000 people who participated in the second parade. While there was a large police presence for it there were no arrests made. In 1979 the Labor Government of New South Wales, led by Neville Wran, also repealed the Summary Offences Act 1988 (NSW) under which the arrests in 1978 were made.

Senior elected officers
1978	Garry Bennett (Spokesperson)
1981–82	Brian McGahen (Chairperson)
1982–83	Brian McGahen (Chairperson)
1983–84	Brian McGahen (Director)
1984–85	Bill Whittaker (Chairman); Damian Furlong (Chairman)
1985–86	Bill Whittaker (Chairman)
1986–87	Bill Whittaker (President, until September 1986); Murray McLachlan (President, from September 1986)
1987–88	Murray McLachlan (President)
1988–89	Murray McLachlan (President)
1989–90	Cath Phillips (President)
1990–91	Cath Phillips (President, until November 1990); Colin Fawcett (President, until June 1991); Richard Cobden (President, from June 1991)
1991–92	Richard Cobden (President)
1992–93	Susan Harben (President)
1993–94	Susan Harben (President)
1994–95	Rob Patmore (President)
Source: A history of the Sydney Gay and Lesbian Mardi Gras

Poster designers
1978	Chris Jones
1979	Fine Arts Workshop, Sydney University
1980	Prue Borthwick
1981	Sheona White, printed by Lucifoil Posters
1982	Andrew Short
1983	Allan Booth
1984	Allan Booth
1985	Peter Tully (Parade), Allan Booth (Party), Phil Jacobs (Festival)
1986	David McDiarmid
1987	Michael Fenaughty
1988	David McDiarmid
1989	Phillip McGrath
1990	David McDiarmid
1991	Geoffrey Gifford
1992	Phillipa Playford
1993	Kendal Baker
1994	Glenn A Moffat
1995	Pierre et Gilles
1996	Darian Zam (Illustration), Brendan Williamson (Design)
1997	Suzanne Boccalatte (Art Direction and Design)
1998	David Corbet, Andrew Medhurst and Bryce Tuckwell, Design Nation
1999	Wendy Neill and Tanja Dunster, 10 Design
2000	Marita Leuver, Leuver Design
2001	Marita Leuver, Leuver Design
2002	Norman Edwards
2003	trigger design (Greg Anderson)
2004	Brett Bush
2005	Guy Campbell
2006	Guy Campbell
2007	Francisco Fisher
2008	Joel Wassermann, Gwarsh
2009	Lewis Oswald
2010	Scott Elk (season creative) Helen White (Photography) Lewis Oswald (designer)
2011	Ethel Yarwood (design concept), Techa Noble and Benja Harney (artwork) Lewis Oswald (designer)
2012	Lewis Oswald
2013	Lewis Oswald
2014	Lewis Oswald (creative director), Peter Novotny (season creative)
Source: A history of the Sydney Gay and Lesbian Mardi Gras

=== 1980 to 1999 ===
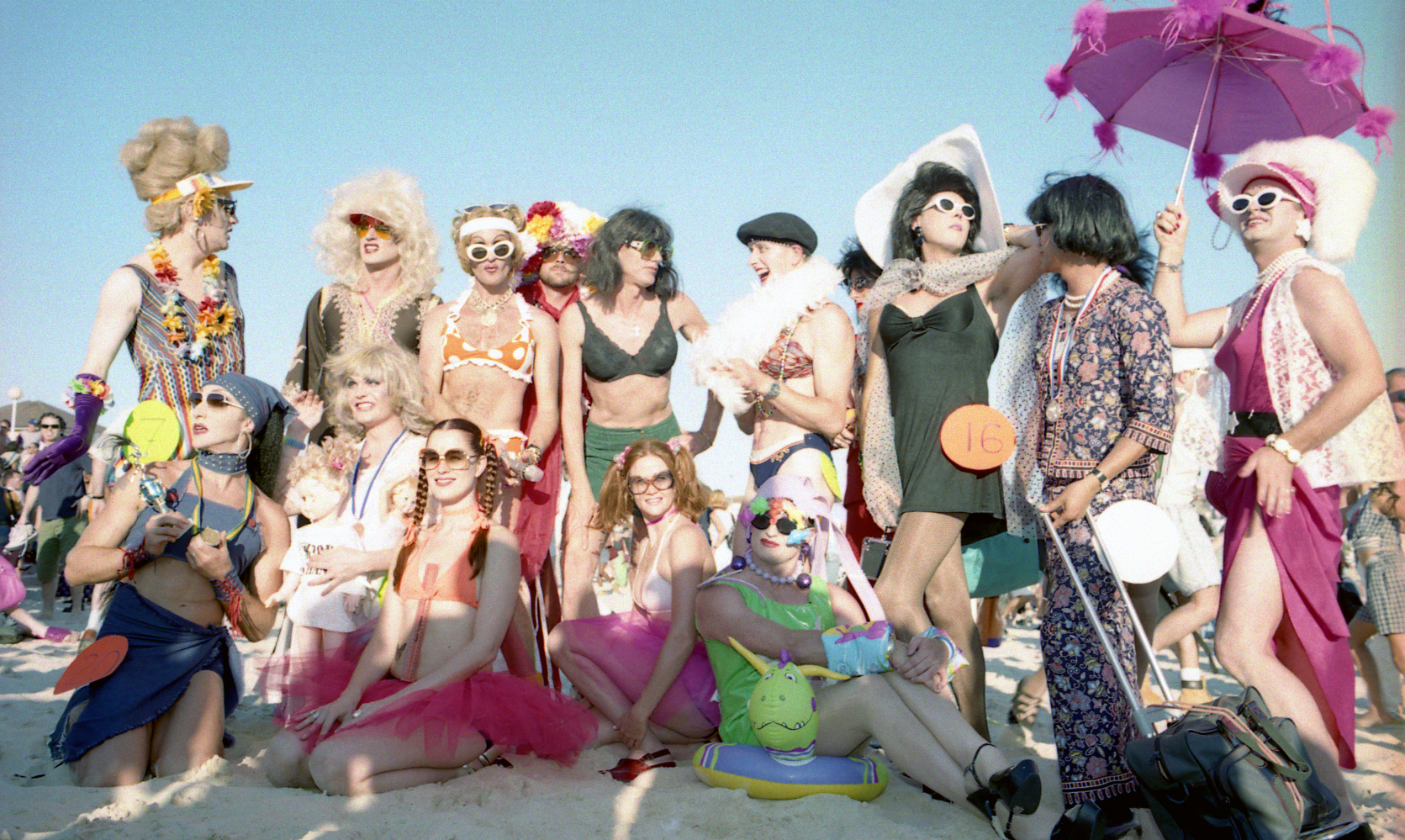
1996 Drag Races at Bondi Beach

In 1980, after the third successful Mardi Gras parade, at community consultations, decisions were made to move the parade to the summer. In 1981, the parade was shifted to February, with the name changed to the "Sydney Gay Mardi Gras". An increasingly large number of people not only participated in the now summertime event, but a crowd of 5,000 came to watch it. 1981's event saw a split develop between lesbian and gays over the inclusion of floats representing businesses. For most of the decade many lesbians excluded themselves from the event. A large post-parade party was held in 1982, which 4,000 people attended. This would continue to become an integral part of the Sydney Gay & Lesbian Mardi Gras. 1983 saw 44 floats participate with 20,000 onlookers. Footage of the 1984 event appeared in the music video for the Cold Chisel song "Saturday Night". In 1987, an estimated 100,000 people came to watch the parade. The mid-1980s saw considerable pressure placed to the Mardi Gras Committee following media controversy regarding AIDS. Despite calls for the parade and the party to be banned, the 1985 parade went ahead with the theme Fighting for Our Lives. In 1988 the parade was renamed the "Sydney Gay and Lesbian Mardi Gras" at an Extraordinary General Meeting.

1991 saw the eighth annual Sydney Gay and Lesbian Film festival, a Mardi Gras event, included in a national film festival for the first time. In this year the parade had become the largest ever held in Australia. In 1992, the festival lasted for four weeks, making it the largest gay and lesbian festival in the world. Also in 1992, Fiona Cunningham-Reid filmed a documentary about the history of the Mardi Gras called "Feed Them to the Cannibals!". By 1993, the Sydney Gay and Lesbian Mardi Gras Parade had become the largest night time outdoor parade in the world. Mardi Gras' Economic Impact Study found that the total Mardi Gras impact into the Australian economy was around A$38 million. In February 1993 an Umbrella Event of the festival was the play "Nothing Personal" designed by Arthur Dicks. In 1994, Mardi Gras Festival adopted the theme We are Family, a nod to it being International Year of the Family. That year there were 137 floats in the parade with 600,000 spectators. For the first time, the parade was filmed by the ABC TV and shown on Sunday 6 March at 8.30 pm. It won its time slot and earned ABC TV its highest ratings in history. The 1997 parade was covered by Libbi Gorr's current affairs show McFeast on ABC TV.

In 1988, Aboriginal Australian dancers Malcolm Cole (1949-1995) and Rodney Junga-Williams (1962-2011), in collaboration with artist Panos Couros, enacted the story of the First Fleet, with Cole as Captain Cook, and Junga-Williams as Joseph Banks – the first ever Aboriginal float entry in the parade. A boatful of black sailors was pulled by a white man, with this leading float commemorating 218 years after Cook's landing and claim on the land. Cole died of HIV/AIDS, and in 2024 his twin brother Robert recreated his costume in order to march again in the parade to commemorate his life.

Criticism of the Sydney Mardi Gras was perhaps at its strongest during the early years of the AIDS crisis, and flared again when in 1994 the national broadcaster ABC telecast the parade for the first time.

In 1996 there was criticism over the inclusion of bisexuals and heterosexuals as members of the Sydney Gay and Lesbian Mardi Gras. It was claimed that the subsequent requirement for those people to correctly answer specific questions, created two classes of membership – namely (1) gays, lesbians and transgender people and (2) bisexuals and heterosexuals.

In 1997 a small group of people who were part of the 1978 events contributed to planning the commemoration of the 20th anniversary of the Sydney Mardi Gras parade in 1998. This group became known as the 78ers and has led each year's Mardi Gras parade since 1998.

=== 2000 to 2009 ===
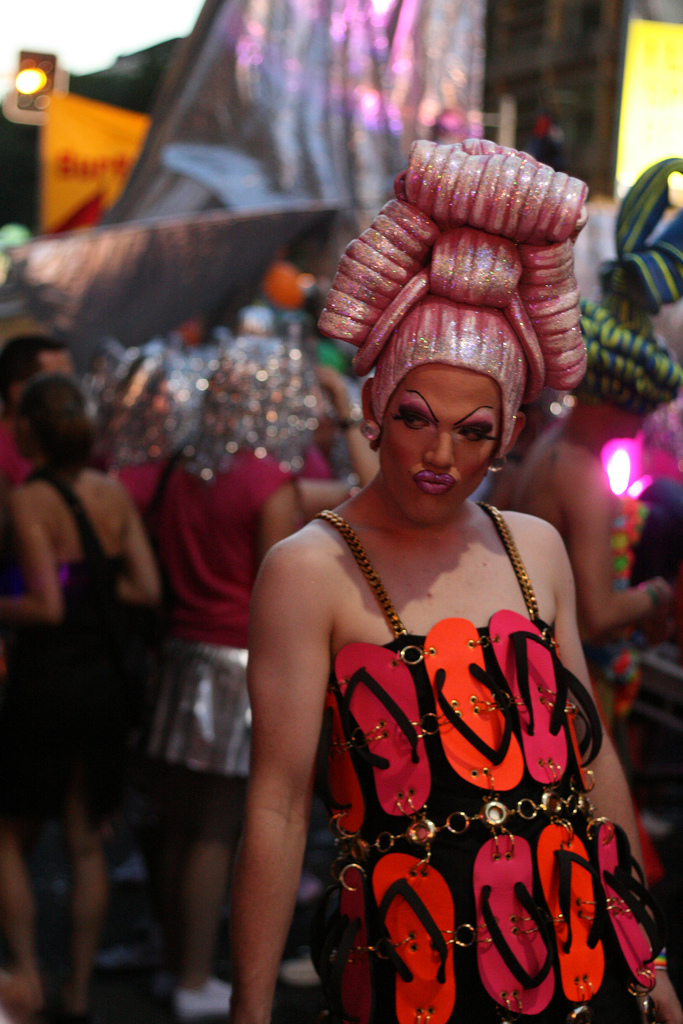
Drag queen, Carmen Geddit from Sydney Drag Royalty dressed as Anthony "Tick" Belrose / Mitzi Del Bra (Hugo Weaving) from the film The Adventures of Priscilla, Queen of the Desert during the 2007 parade.

The 2001 Parade was broadcast on Network Ten and had a theme of gay and lesbian parenting. The 2002 event saw a loss of A$400,000. In August the organising company was bankrupt. In 2003, the festival organisers responded to claims that the event was becoming too commercialised by implementing a scaled-down, grassroots approach. The 2009 performance figures indicated about 9,500 participants and 134 floats were part of the parade, making it the largest ever. Up to 300,000 spectators from Australia and overseas turned out in 2011 for the celebrations.

Mardi Gras, at different times, has attracted criticism from its own members, LGBTQIA+ communities, and a variety of religious and political groups. Some argue Mardi Gras is inherently subversive to traditional Christian, Islamic and Jewish values. Each year the event is held, Fred Nile, a former member of the New South Wales Legislative Council and a former minister of the Uniting Church in Australia, leads a prayer for rain on the event.

In January 2008 Robert Forsyth, the Anglican bishop of South Sydney, condemned Corpus Christi for opening the Mardi Gras because it depicted Judas seducing a gay Jesus as well as Jesus' administration of gay marriage between two apostles. Director Leigh Rowney accepted that it would generate discussion on homosexuality and Christianity and stated: "I wanted this play in the hands of a Christian person like myself to give it dignity but still open it up to answering questions about Christianity as a faith system." Playwright Terrence McNally, a gay man, received death threats when it was played in the United States.

=== 2010 to 2019 ===
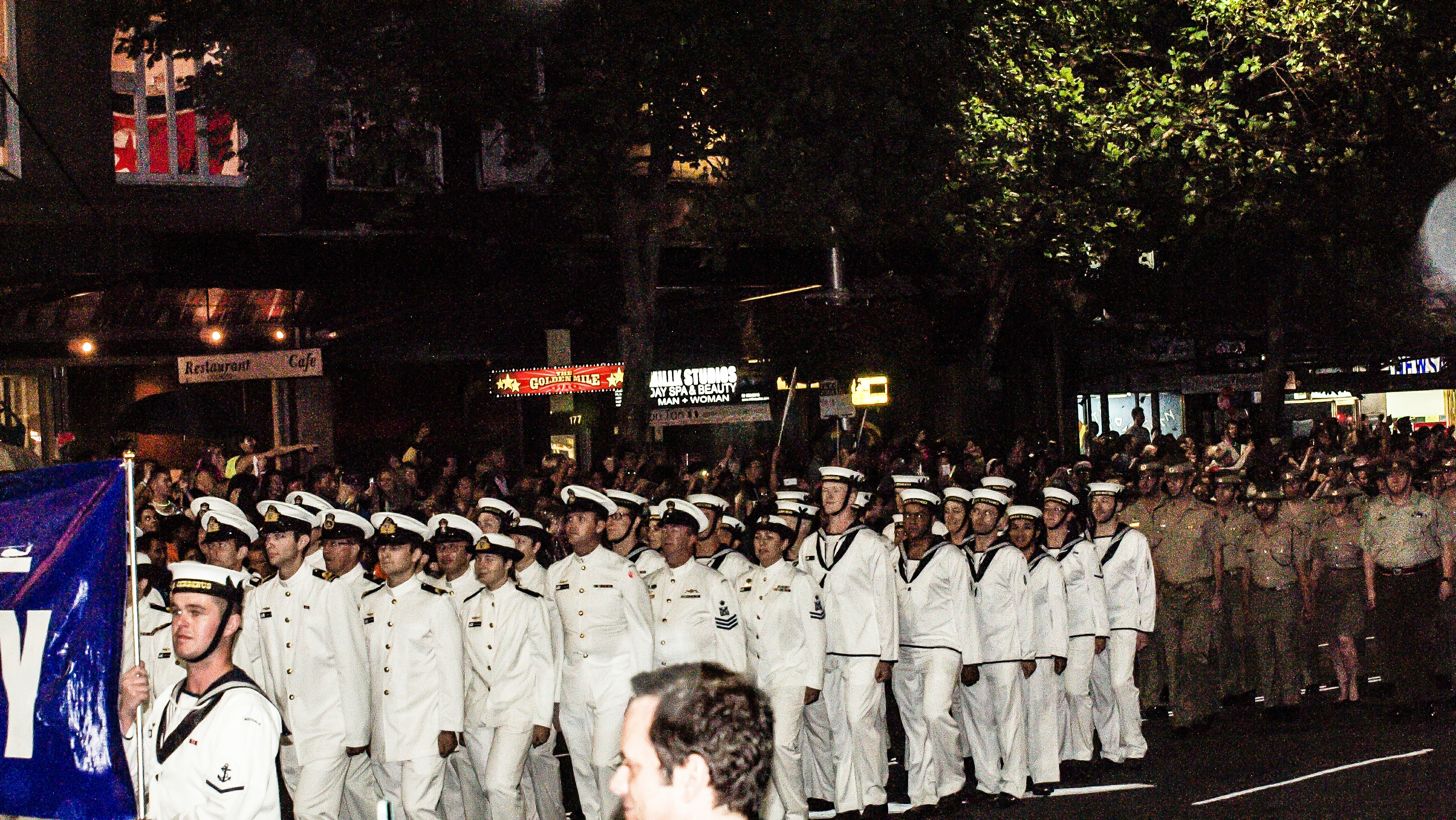
Australian Defence Force 2013

In early 2011, members of the organisation unanimously voted to include intersex formally into the organisation at the Annual General Meeting and adopt the formal use of the LGBTQIA+ acronym. To allow for greater inclusion of the LGBTQIA+ community it represents (including those identifying as bisexual, transgender, queer, intersex and asexual), on 17 November 2011 the festival and event organisers changed the event name to "Sydney Mardi Gras". On the same date the organisation reverted to its former name, "Sydney Gay & Lesbian Mardi Gras" (from "New Mardi Gras"), as more than 9,100 participants joined in the 2012 Parade, on 134 floats.

In 2011 Mardi Gras came under fire from gay and lesbian communities for removing the words "Gay and Lesbian" from the festival's name. The organisation's board confessed that they did not adequately consult the community in such an important decision. The organisation was also criticised for focusing on the requests of corporate sponsors, and allowing their floats rather than maintaining its original sense of identity. This followed the 2010 season in which the Mardi Gras Parade and Party were held on separate dates for the first time in history. The name of the festival was subsequently restored as the Sydney Gay and Lesbian Mardi Gras.

In 2013, the New South Wales Police were accused of police brutality after a video shot by a bystander and uploaded to YouTube showed a handcuffed man thrown to the ground twice by an officer. The man repeatedly kicked police officers before being handcuffed. By 2014, all charges against the bystander were withdrawn by police and the officer concerned was facing disciplinary proceedings. Disciplinary proceedings against the officer were withdrawn.

On a number of occasions, there have been controversies with, and bans of, the UFO-related Raelians participation in the parade. A Raelian spokesman said the bans were unfair as the Raelians support non-discrimination and have gay and lesbian members.

In 2012 Mardi Gras organisers faced the issue of having a Sydney Polyamorists float in the parade, whilst also promoting same-sex marriage for couples. Particularly, as the 2012 Mardi Gras theme was "universal and infinite love", some polyamorists felt discriminated against. The issue was resolved with a polyamory float, based on the theme, "Queer Polyamory". In the 2014 Mardi Gras there was another float, "Polyamory Sydney 'Birds of a Feather, love together' – the infinite love Nest".

In 2015, the organisation was accused of perpetuating gay stereotypes and for excluding other members of the LGBTIQ community.

In 2019, an attempt was made to include more groups under the queer umbrella, but this was voted down by the gay and lesbian members, who wanted the event to remain exclusive. This decision was met with criticism, as the current name excludes bisexual, transgender, intersex, and other identities, leading people to feel excluded from the organization's official title.

=== 2020s ===
In 2020, the Sydney Gay and Lesbian Mardi Gras was held just prior to the COVID-19 pandemic in Australia. NSW Health advised there was no evidence of community transmission of the virus at that time. British singer Dua Lipa debuted her single Physical at the event.

In 2021, as a result of the ongoing COVID-19 pandemic the parade, held on 6 March 2021, was relocated to the nearby Sydney Cricket Ground as a paid, ticketed event with 36,000 spectators and was televised live on the Special Broadcasting Service.

In 2023, independent senator for Victoria Lidia Thorpe disrupted the parade in an attempt to raise awareness about intractable social issues such as Indigenous rates of incarceration and the role of police in that process.

In 2024, after the alleged murder of Jesse Baird and his partner Luke Davies around 20 February 2024 by serving NSW Police officer Beau Lamarre, the Mardi Gras board decided to ban members of the force from participating in Mardi Gras, owing to sensitivities in the LGBTQIA+ community and recollections of past poor treatment by NSW Police. However this decision was reversed on 28 February 2024, and it was agreed by both the board and Police Commissioner Karen Webb that the Force could participate, but not in uniform. They would march as a group, without a float.

Additionally in 2024, Malcolm Cole's twin brother Robert recreated his 1988 Captain Cook costume, in order to wear it in the parade to commemorate Malcolm's life.

== Resources ==
The Australian Queer Archives, City of Sydney Archives, Pride History Group, and the State Library of New South Wales hold an extensive collections of material related to the Sydney Gay and Lesbian Mardi Gras, including oral history interviews, organisational records, personal papers, posters, clippings, and photographs.

In February 2024, a new museum, titled Qtopia, opened in Darlinghurst, Sydney, celebrating queer stories with an extensive collection of objects related to queer culture in Sydney. Past exhibitions at Qtopia have also included a collection of costumes that have been worn over the years in the Mardi Gras Parade as well displays of visual media related to the parade and the Mardi Gras after party. It sits across three main sites which include the main building at 301 Forbes St., Darlinghurst, the substation and the underground toilet block, both of which are located at the northern end of Taylor Square.

== Events ==
=== Mardi Gras Parade ===
External media

Images
- 2016 Parade

Video
- 2005 Parade
- 2012 Pool Party

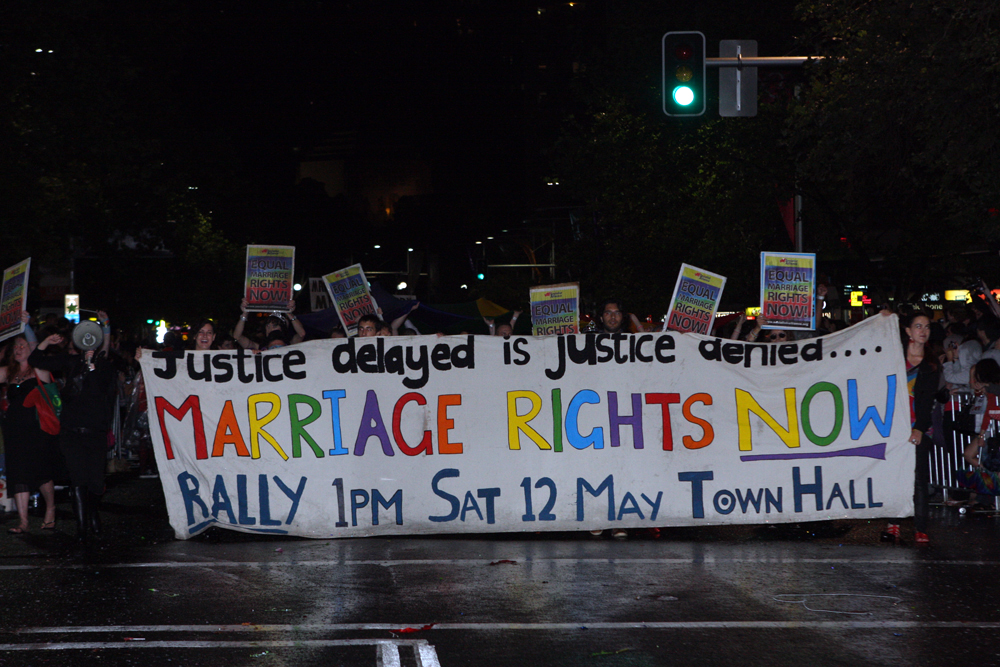
Participants 2012

The Sydney Gay and Lesbian Mardi Gras festival culminates in the renowned Sydney Mardi Gras Parade, a homosexual rights protest and celebration of sexuality. The parade features more than 12,500 entrants in colourful costumes and elaborate floats, who represent a community group, topical theme or political message. Parade entrants include members of Parents, Families and Friends of Lesbians and Gays, the Australian Defence Force, Amnesty International Australia, Australian Marriage Equality, City of Sydney, Fire & Rescue New South Wales, Taronga Conservation Society and DNA among many others.

Each parade starts with approximately 200 Dykes on Bikes riding up Oxford Street. It is often accompanied by fireworks displays, which are launched from the rooftops of buildings along the parade route. Approximately 300,000 spectators watch the Parade as it snakes 1.7 kilometres (1.1 mi) from the Sydney central business district to Darlinghurst.

The parade travels along Oxford Street before turning into Flinders Street and finally into the bus lane that runs parallel to Anzac Parade – to the parade end. These roads and others including some around Hyde Park, are closed to traffic for the duration of the parade and for a few hours after as clean-up operations proceed.

Each year, a chief of parade (grand marshal), is chosen by the organisation New Mardi Gras as someone who represents the values and spirit of Mardi Gras. This honourable title has previously been awarded to:

- 2004 – Monica Hingston, former nun and cousin of Cardinal George Pell
- 2007 – Rupert Everett, gay actor
- 2008 – Margaret Cho, bisexual American comedian
- 2009 – Matthew Mitcham, Australian Olympic gold-medalist, world record holder and 2008 Australian Sports Performer of the Year
- 2010 – Amanda Lepore, transgender model/performer
- 2011 – Instead of a single Chief of Parade leading the march, eight high-profile heroes were chosen to lead the Parade. These were Lily Tomlin, lesbian actress and comedian; Peter Tatchell, a world-renowned gay rights campaigner; Don Baxter, Executive Director of the Australian Federation of AIDS Organisations at that time; Bev Lange, chief executive officer of the Bobby Goldsmith Foundation at the time, a former President of the Sydney Gay and Lesbian Mardi Gras, and a former co-chair of the Sydney Gay Games; Lex Watson and Sue Wills, Campaign Against Moral Prosecution's (CAMP) first Co-Presidents; and Hannah Williams and Savannah Supski, who had recently protested against the ban against same-sex couples at Hannah's Melbourne school formal. The same year, Ignatius Jones consulted as Artistic Director to oversee the creative production of the Parade.
- 2012 – Shelley Argent, the national spokesperson for Parents and Friends of Lesbians and Gays and 2011 Queensland Senior Australian of the Year

The Sydney Gay and Lesbian Mardi Gras Parade is extensively covered by the media. In 2011, it was broadcast on radio by Joy 94.9 FM Melbourne and 2SER 107.3 FM Sydney. The Parade was also shown live on Foxtel's Arena in its entirety. The Arena broadcast was presented by hosts Louie Spence of Pineapple Dance Studios, Charlotte Dawson, Ruby Rose and Matthew Mitcham. The Parade was also broadcast on radio live by various community radio stations, via the CBAA's Community Radio Network satellite. In 2012, Optus, a corporate sponsor, broadcast a delayed and edited highlights of the parade via www.mardigrastv.org.au. In 2014, SBS TV broadcast delayed and edited coverage of the parade highlights, hosted by Tom Ballard, Patrick Abboud and Heather Peace.

Despite its name, Sydney Gay and Lesbian Mardi Gras is not held on Mardi Gras (Shrove Tuesday) or indeed, on a Tuesday at all. In recent years, the Mardi Gras Parade has been on the first Saturday of March, with a festival of events going for approximately three weeks preceding it.

The parade running order for 4 March 2017.

=== Mardi Gras Party (Post Parade) ===
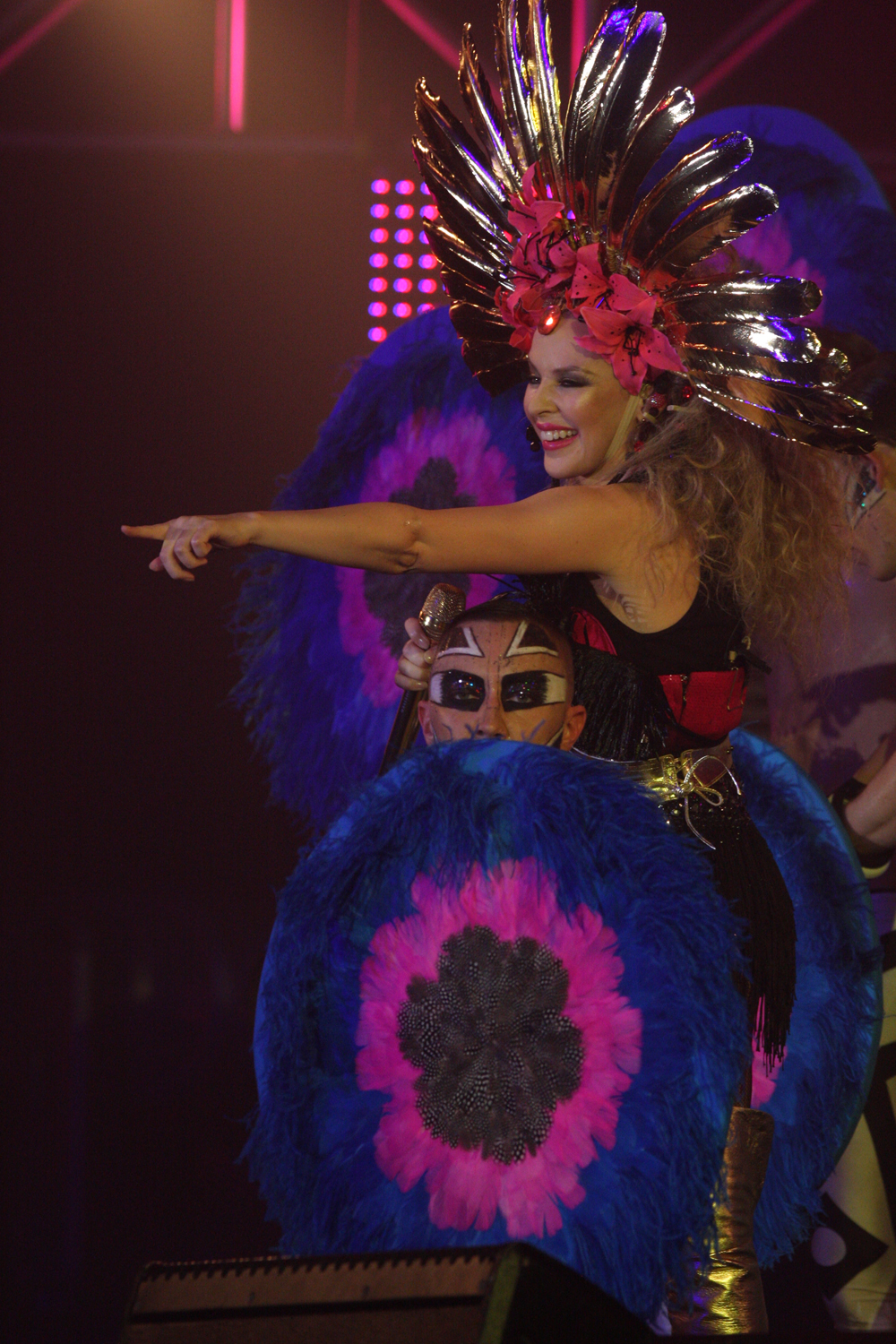
Kylie Minogue performed a 20 min set of her greatest hits at the post-parade after party in 2012.

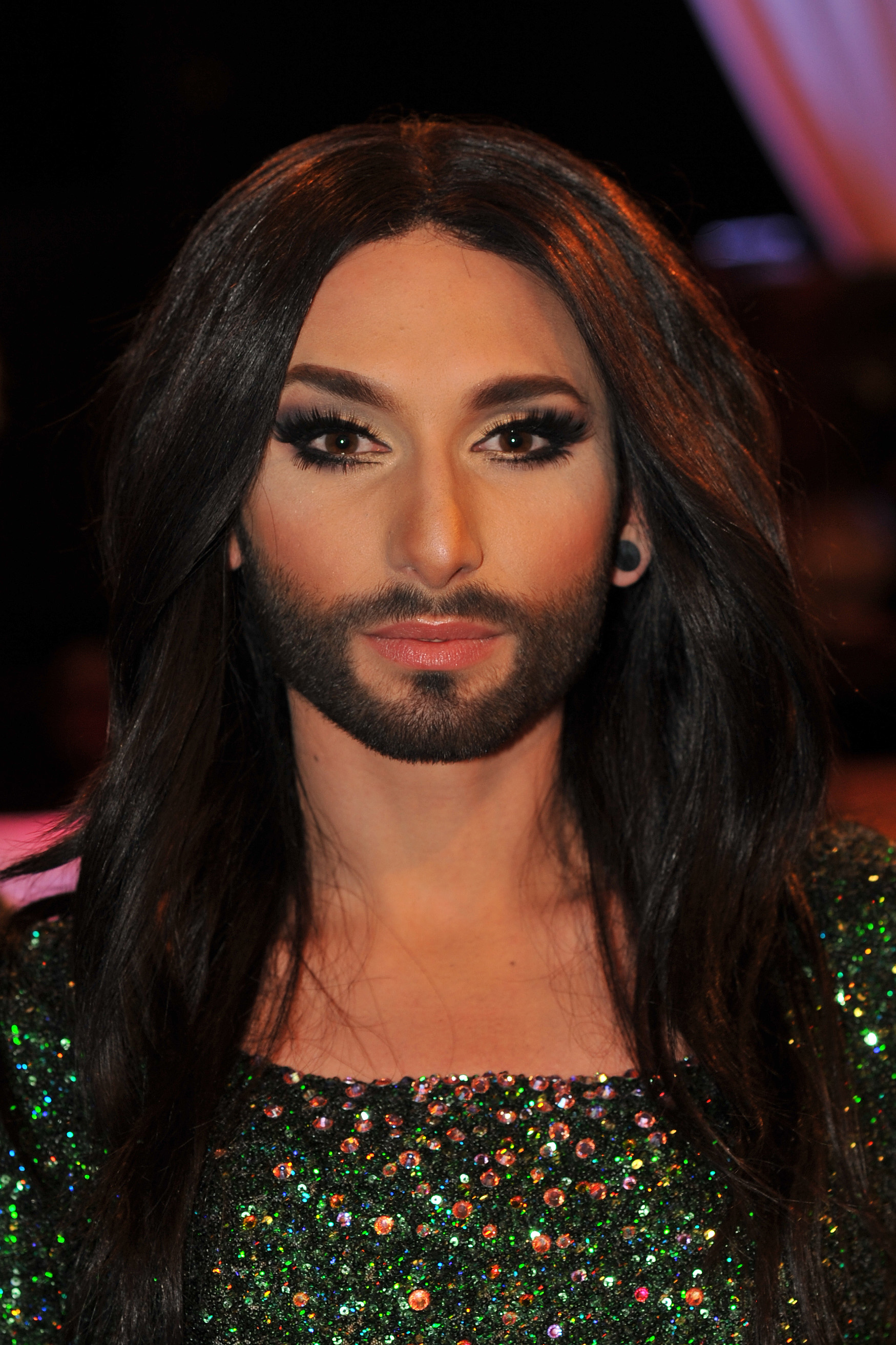
Conchita Wurst 2016

The post parade party is one of the largest ongoing party events in the country. Mardi Gras Party attendances at Sydney's Hordern Pavilion / Royal Hall of Industries peaked in 1998 with 27,000 tickets sold. In the years since 17,000 to 20,000 tickets are consistently sold, an increase over the first Parade Ball held in 1980 at the Paddington Town Hall, a BYO event which attracted 700 guests. Although, by the late first decade of the 21st century, ticket sales has begun to fall, with the 2012 post parade party selling out at 15,300 tickets; and ticket sales a little lower again in 2013.

The 2010 and 2011 post-parade parties were both held a week after the Mardi Gras parade and it was commented in 2010 by event organisers that they had "...looked at how other major festival-type events are produced around the world and... ...Rio and New Orleans are not just a single parade Â-” though they have that as their core. They encompass many small parades and parties and go on for days." In 2012 when Kylie Minogue attended both the Mardi Gras parade and the post-parade party they returned to being held on the same day.

Several well known local and international artists have performed at the Party and include:

- 1990 – Sam Backo, Marcia Hines
- 1991 – Tina Arena
- 1994 – John Paul Young, Kylie Minogue
- 1995 – Boy George
- 1996 – Trudi Valentine, Thelma Houston
- 1997 – Chaka Khan, Village People
- 1998 – Jimmy Somerville, Kylie Minogue, Dannii Minogue
- 1999 – Dannii Minogue, Marcia Hines, Erin Hamilton, Jimmy Barnes
- 2001 – Vanessa Amorosi, Sheena Easton, Christine Anu
- 2002 – Human Nature, Bardot, Deborah Cox, Lorna Luft
- 2003 – Suzanne Palmer, Joan Rivers, Brandon Gaukel
- 2005 – Tina Arena, Nicki French, Darren Hayes, Courtney Act
- 2006 – Baby Marcelo, Jimmy Somerville, Mary Kiani, Xenza
- 2007 – Young Divas, Boy George, Dannii Minogue, Log Log Binks
- 2008 – Cyndi Lauper, Walter Hanna, Olivia Newton-John
- 2009 – Alison Jiear, Tina Arena, Miami Horror
- 2010 – George Michael, Kelly Rowland, Adam Lambert, Amanda Lepore
- 2011 – Wynter Gordon, Calvin Harris, Alexis Jordan, Frankie Knuckles, Larry Tee, Bob Downe
- 2012 – Kylie Minogue, RuPaul, Sneaky Sound System, Shauna Jensen, Sam Sparro
- 2013 – Loreen, Delta Goodrem, Heather Small, The Presets, Jake Shears
- 2014 – Tina Arena, Courtney Act, Samantha Jade, Marcia Hines, Nathan Mahon, Adam George
- 2015 – Dannii Minogue, Nick Jonas, Jessica Mauboy, Jake Shears, Betty Who, Rufus Wainwright, Courtney Act
- 2016 – Conchita Wurst, Deborah Cox, Courtney Act
- 2017 – Client Liaison, The Veronicas, Steve Grand, Nat Conway, Greg Gould
- 2018 – Cher, Starley, Seann Miley Moore
- 2019 – Kim Petras, Jake Shears, Leiomy Maldonado, PNAU, Courtney Act, Paul Capsis.
- 2020 – Dua Lipa, Kesha, Pabllo Vittar, Sam Smith
- 2021 – Rita Ora
- 2022 – Darren Hayes, Vanessa Amorosi
- 2023 – Sugababes, Agnes

=== Mardi Gras Festival ===
The Mardi Gras festival runs in conjunction with the parade every year and in 1987 the festival included 35 events and then by 1998 the festival had grown to contribute an estimated $99 million to the Sydney economy.

In 2026 the 17 days of the festival included "...more than 120 community events, dance parties, theatre and music" and the festival also includes cabaret and comedy. It was commented that in 2024 the festival had "...over 150 performers across the Festival’s key events..." including "...comedians, drag and performance artists..." and "...international and local DJs...".

During the 17 days of the 2023 festival, which was held during Sydney WorldPride, there were 310,000 people who attended festival events which included large scale events such as the WorldPride opening ceremony in the Doman, Fair Day, the Mardi Gras after party and Bondi Beach party. Of those 310,000, people, 103,800 were visitors to Sydney and 21,000 people were international visitors. In years when WorldPride is not being held in concjunction with the Mardi Gras festival the yearly average numbers of visitors to Sydney are around 30,000 people.

There are many literature and arts events, forum and conferences to attend during the festival and individual and team sports have always been a big part of the festival. Multi-disc Mardi Gras compilation albums were released in 1995, 1997, 2002 and 2003.

=== Queer Screen and the Mardi Gras Film Festival ===
The inaugural Mardi Gras Film Festival was held in 1994 by Queer Screen. It continues to be held in conjunction with the Mardi Gras festival and it presented international and local LGBTQIA+ films. Queer Screen also has also held a separate film festival, the Queer Screen Film Fest, since 2013.

=== Mardi Gras Fair Day ===
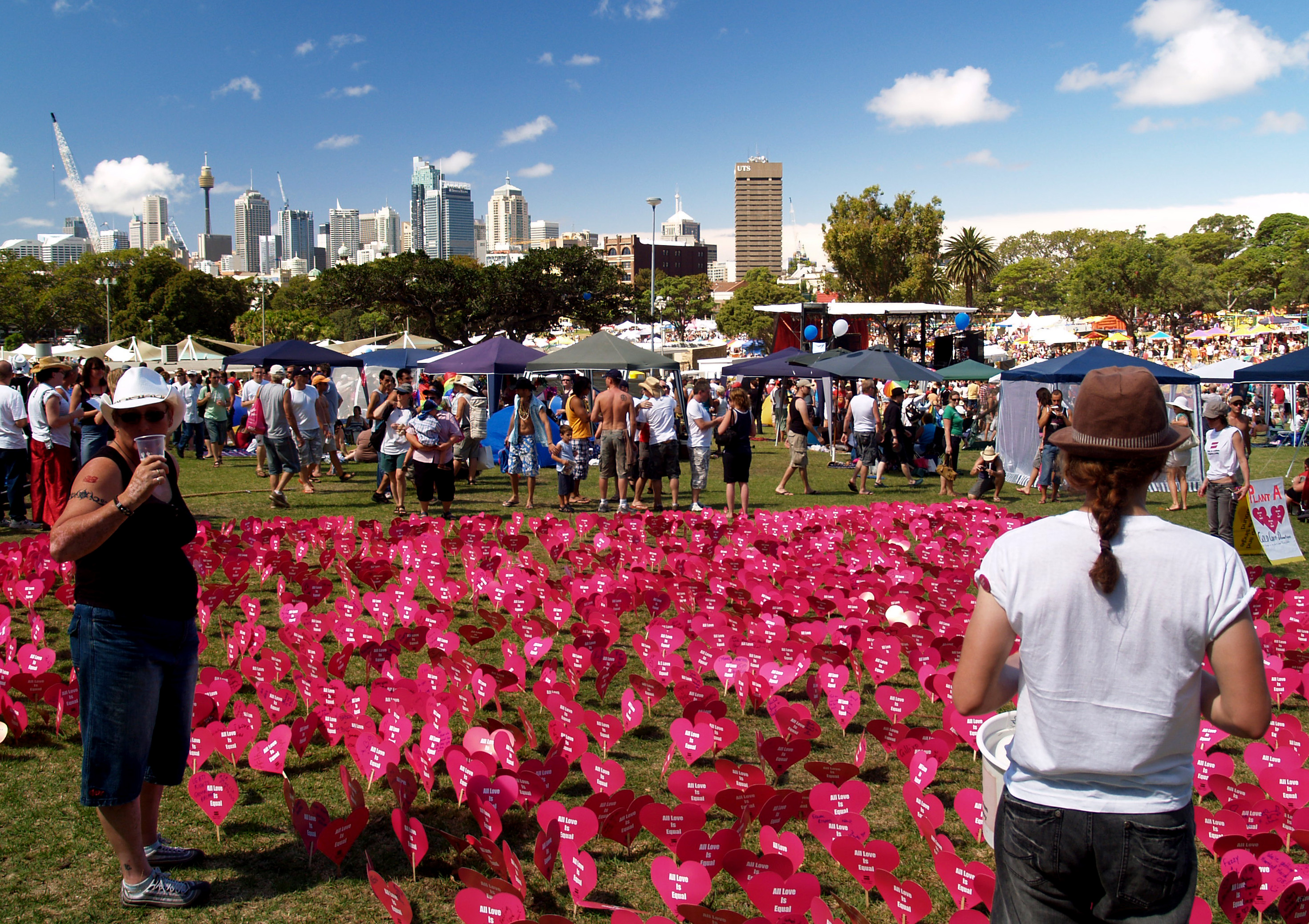
Fair Day 2007 "Sea of Hearts" by the Sydney Gay and Lesbian Rights Lobby

In 1979 an 'Alternative Lifestyle Fair' as part of a week of activities around International Gay Solidarity Day. During the early 1980s the Sydney Gay and Lesbian Business Association held an annual Fair Day, which was brought into the Sydney Gay Mardi Gras program in 1985. From 1985 to 1988 the Business Association continued to run the Fair, which was subsequently run by the Sydney Gay and Lesbian Mardi Gras from 1989. The event is the kick off event for the official Mardi Gras season in Victoria Park, Sydney for Sydney's wider LGBTQIA+ communities and their friends and family. Up to 70,000 people routinely turn out to sit on the grass, browse the stalls and catch up with old friends or make some new ones. Fair Day 2011 saw record numbers of attendees. Entertainment came from the Foxtel Main Stage and included a set from Zoe Badwi and Garçon Garçon, and one of the biggest ever "Mr and Mrs Fair Day" competitions. Approximately 250 volunteers assisted with 220 stalls made up of many LGBTQIA+community groups.

In 2017, Mardi Gras Fair Day was held at Camperdown Memorial Rest Park on Sunday 19 February.

=== Mardi Gras Awards ===
Hall of Fame winners
1992	Brian McGahen, Bruce Belcher, David Wilkins, Kimberly O'Sullivan, Lance Gowland, Peter Tully, Ron Muncaster
1993	Colin Fawcett, Leggs Galore, Robyn Laverack, and Cath Phillips
1994	Barry Cecchini, Peter Macdonnell, and Bruce Pollack
1995	Ron Austin, Murray McLachlan, and Bill Whittaker
1996	Corby Beard, Brent Beadle, Richard Cobden
1997	Kathy Pavlich and Susan Harben
1998	Margaret McMann and Stephen Alkins
1999	Gillian Minervini, Phillipa Playford, Tony Crewes, Rodney Thorpe
2000	Bill Morley, George Petersen, David McDiarmid. John Marsden
2001	Brian Hobday, Gary Leeson, Ron Smith
2002	Dr Richard Liddy, Jade-Snow Kemety, Katrina Marton, Doris Fish, Richard Wherret
Source: Hall of Fame & Lifetime Achievement Award Winners

The Mardi Gras Awards are presented to organisations and individuals who made an outstanding contribution to Mardi Gras and the gay and lesbian community.

== WorldPride Sydney 2023 ==
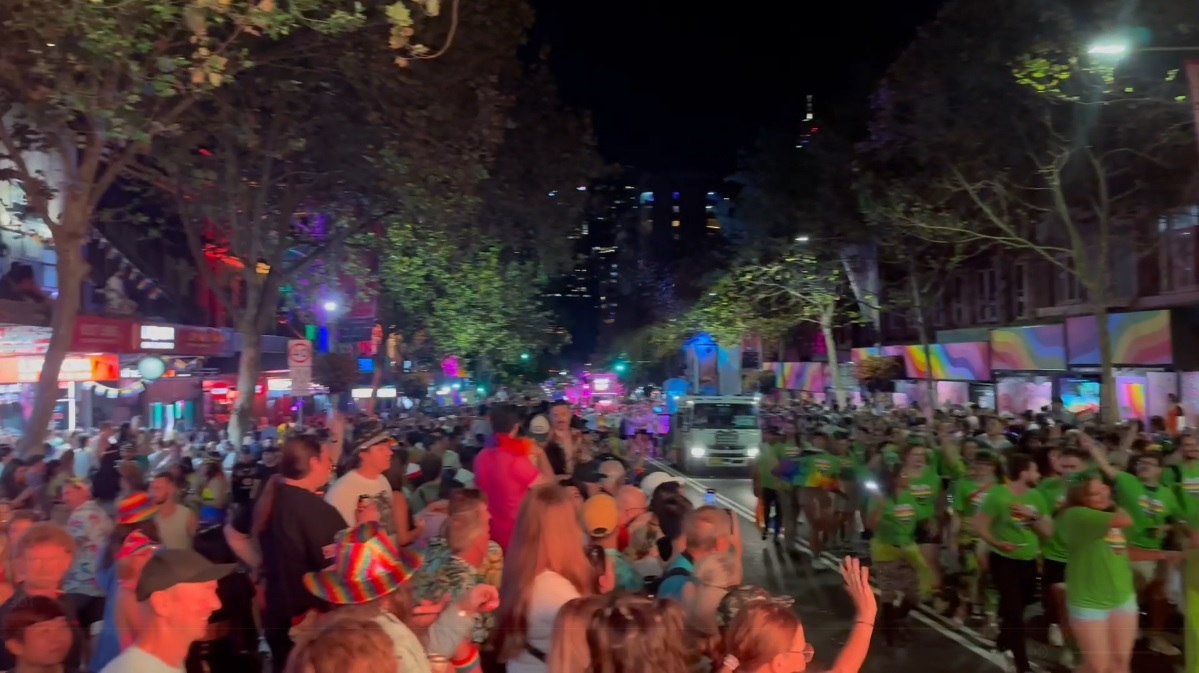
Over 250,000 people watched the Sydney Gay and Lesbian Mardi Gras parade along Oxford st, in Darlinghurst during Sydney WorldPride in 2023.

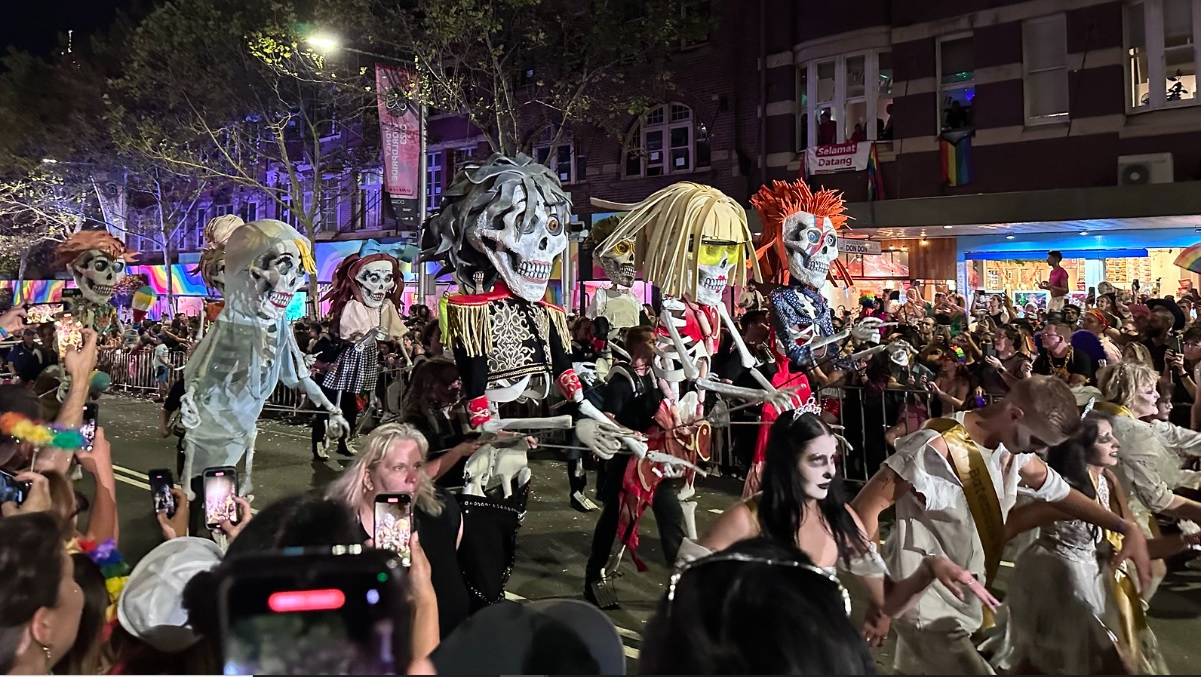
A float in the Mardi Gras parade during Sydey WorldPride 2023. The skeleton on the right references the character Ziggy Stardust that David Bowie would perform as in his concerts during his glam rock era from 1972 to 1974.

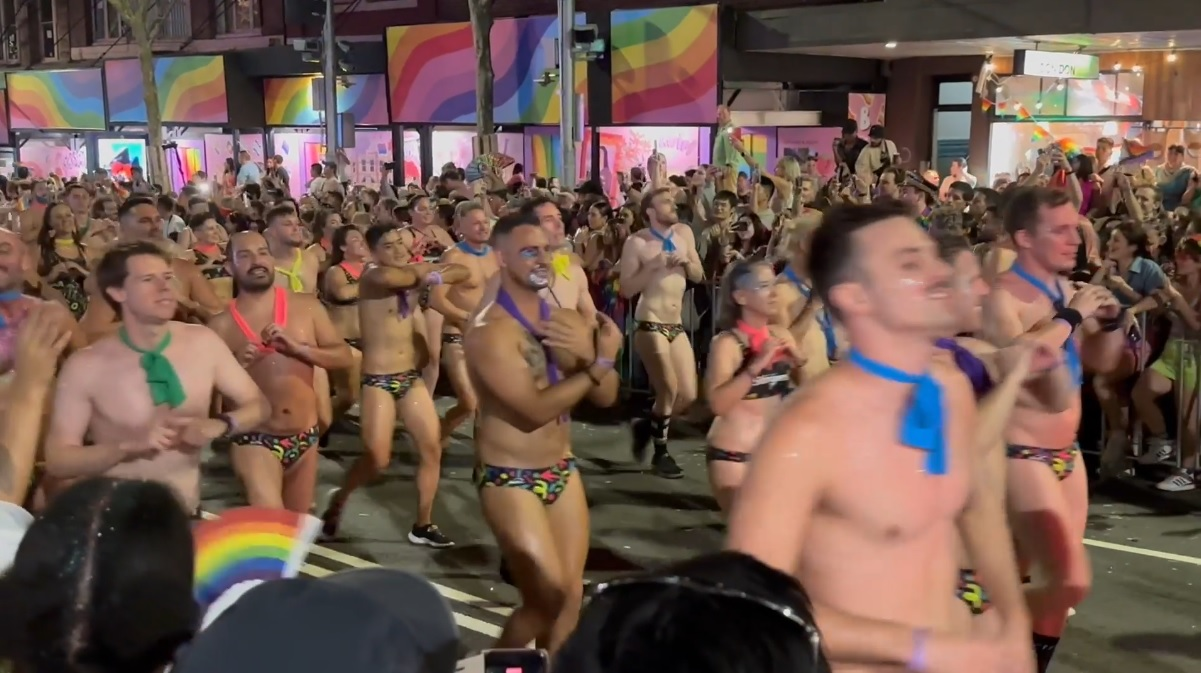
People participating in the Mardi Gras Parade. In the background can be seen construction hoardings that were installed along the Mardi Gras parade route on Oxford street in December 2022 and the hoardings celebrated LGBTQIA+ stories in Sydney. 2023.

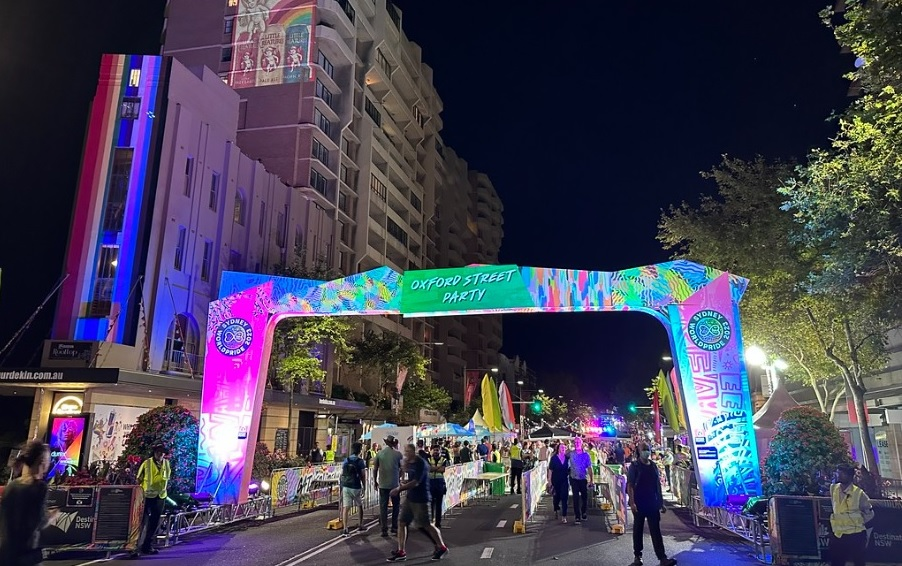
Entrance to the Oxford st party, held on Oxford st in Darlinghurst during Sydney WorldPride in 2023.

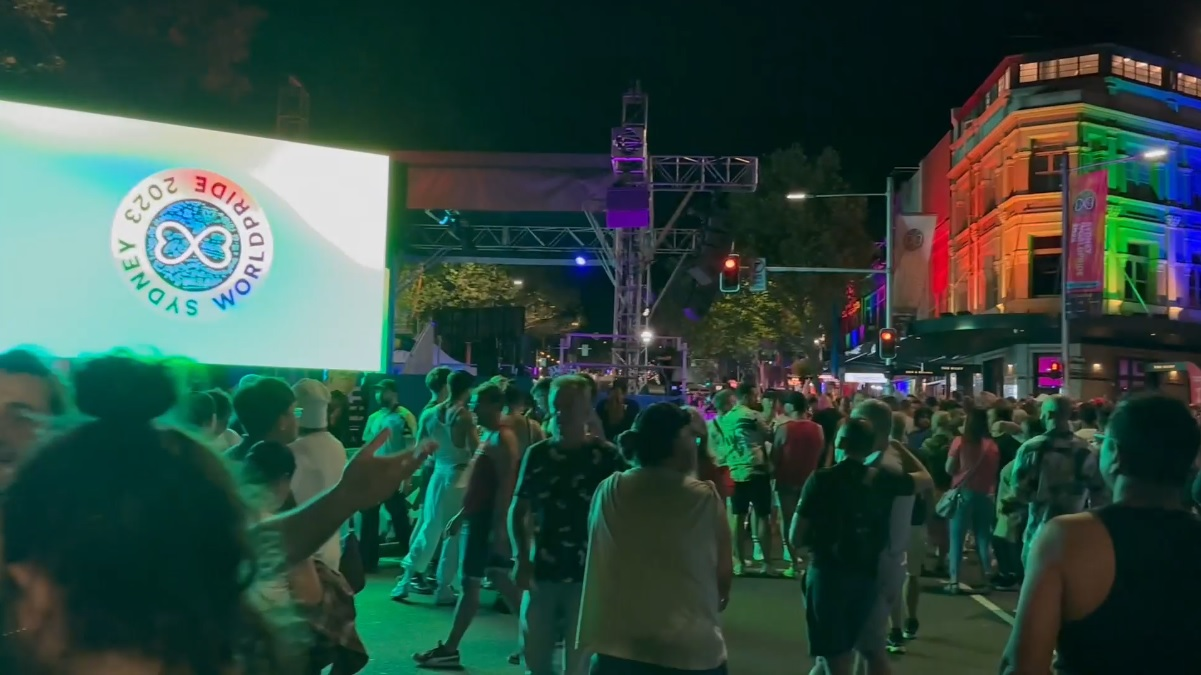
Crowds during the Oxford st party. 2023

InterPride, at their October 2019 Annual General Meeting of three hundred delegate organizations, held in Athens, Greece chose Sydney, Australia to host WorldPride 2023, the first time WorldPride will be held in the Southern Hemisphere or Asia Pacific region. Sydney received 60% of the vote ahead of the other bid contenders Montreal, Canada (36%) and Houston, Texas (3%).

WorldPride 2023 coincided with the 50th Anniversary of the first Australian Gay Pride Week, 45th Anniversary of the first Sydney Gay & Lesbian Mardi Gras and 5th Anniversary of Marriage Equality in Australia. According to the bid document the stated objective of WorldPride Sydney 2023 is to celebrate the diversity of culture and identity in the Asia Pacific region, while shining a light on widespread human rights abuses.

Sydney WorldPride 2023 was held between 17 February and 5 March during Australia's summer and consisted of a 17-day combined 45th Anniversary Sydney Gay & Lesbian Mardi Gras/WorldPride 2023 Festival. The centrepiece was a three-day LGBTQIA+ Human Rights and Health Conference focusing on LGBTQIA+ people's experiences of violence, torture, abuse, discrimination and persecution in the Asia Pacific region and more broadly.

During the 17 days of the 2023 Mardi Gras festival there were 310,000 people who attended festival events which included large scale events such as the WorldPride opening ceremony in the Domain, Fair Day, the Mardi Gras after party and Bondi Beach party. Of those 310,000 people, 103,800 were visitors to Sydney and 21,000 people were international visitors.

In February and March 2023, a new temporary exhibition about queer stories in Sydney titled "Qtopia" was held to coinicde with Sydney WorldPride and it was located in two levels of the bandstand pavilion in Green Park, Darlinghurst, as well as at the National Art School that sits adjacent to Green Park in Darlinghurst. One year after Sydney WorldPride, in 2024, the exhibition became a permanent museum that sits across three main sites which include the main building at 301 Forbes St., Darlinghurst, the substation and the underground toilet block, all of which are located at the northern end of Taylor Square.

The underground toilet block was opened to the public in 1907 and then closed in 1998 and it now hosts "exhibitions exploring Sydney's gay beat, sauna and cruising culture of the 1980s and 90s." and it was itself the location of a popular beat in Sydney for decades until its closure.

The new museum has an extensive collection of objects related to queer culture in Sydney and the substations 40-seat theatre hosts performances including music, drag, comedy, cabaret and poetry all year round with numerous performances held during Mardi Gras in February and March of each year.

The Sydney Opera House was lit up in progress pride flag colours during WorldPride and new rainbow public artworks where installed across Sydney including a new rainbow path at Waterman's Cove in Barangaroo. In December 2022 construction hoardings were installed along the Mardi Gras parade route on Oxford street in Darlinghurst and the hoardings celebrated LGBTQIA+ stories in Sydney. They remained in place until around September 2025 when two thirds of them were removed.

Other stated signature events included:

- Aboriginal Smoking Ceremony and Welcome to Country
- 19 February – Fair Day
- 24 February – The WorldPride Opening Ceremony features performances by Kylie Minogue and Dannii Minogue, Charli XCX, Jessica Mauboy, Deborah Cheetham Fraillon, and Electric Fields; it was hosted by Courtney Act and Casey Donovan
- 25 February – Mardi Gras Parade
- 25 February – Mardi Gras Party, featuring Sugababes and Agnes
- Interpride Reception
- 26 February – Laneway
- 26 February – Domain Dance Party, featuring Kelly Rowland
- First Nations Gathering Space
- 1–3 March – Human Right Conference
- First Nations Gala Concert
- Mardi Gras International Arts Festival
- 30th Queer Screen Mardi Gras Film Festival
- 4 March – Bondi Beach Party, featuring Nicole Scherzinger
- WorldPride First Nations Gala Concert
- Sissy Ball Grand Final
- 5 March – World Pride March (over the Sydney Harbour Bridge)
- 5 March – World Pride Closing Ceremony, featuring MUNA, Kim Petras, G Flip and Ava Max.

== Support ==
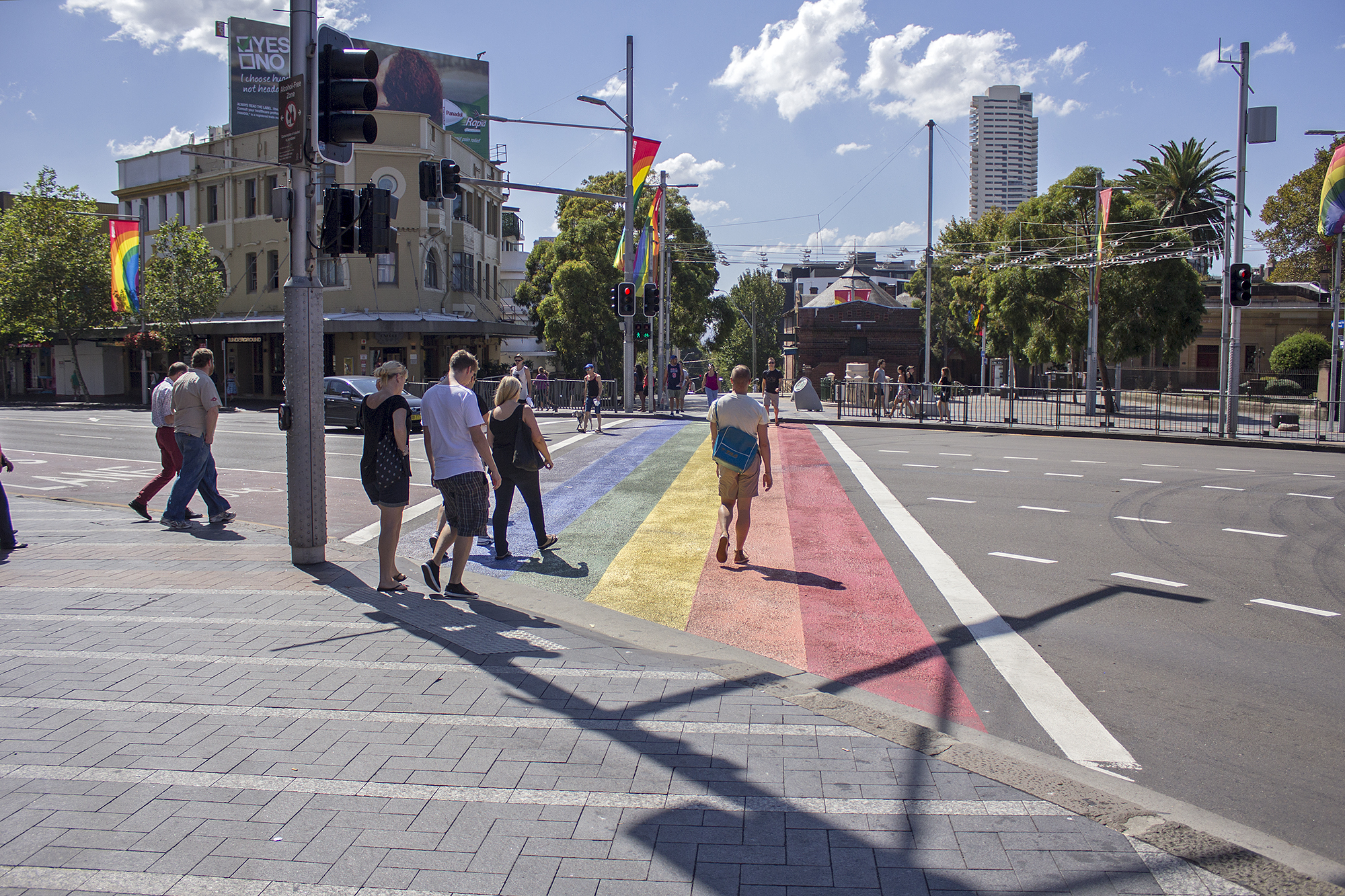

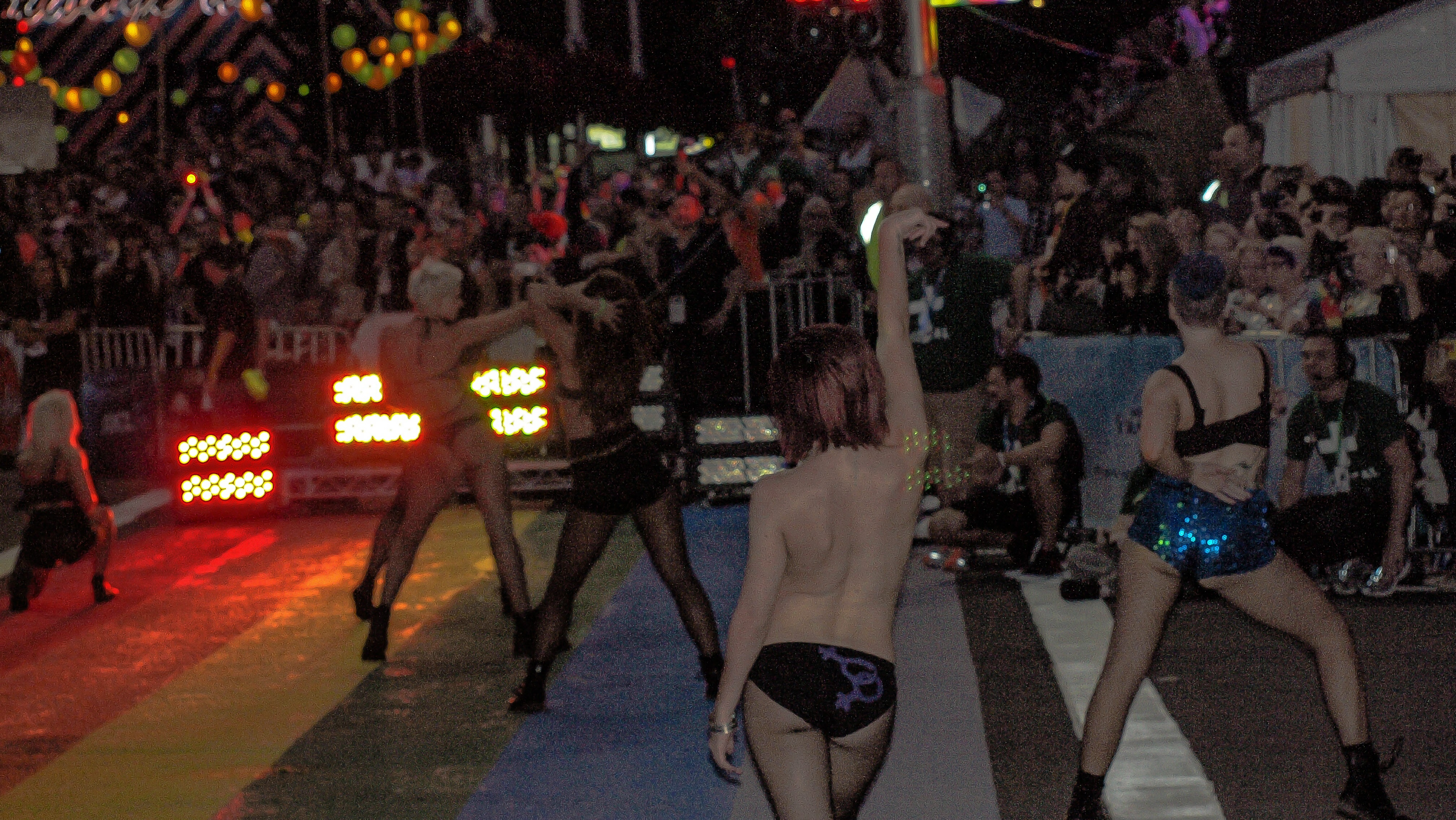
The first temporary rainbow crossing in Australia located between the southern and northern ends of Taylor Square on Oxford St. It was first installed in February 2013 for the 35th Sydney Gay and Lesbian Mardi Gras and then removed in April 2013.

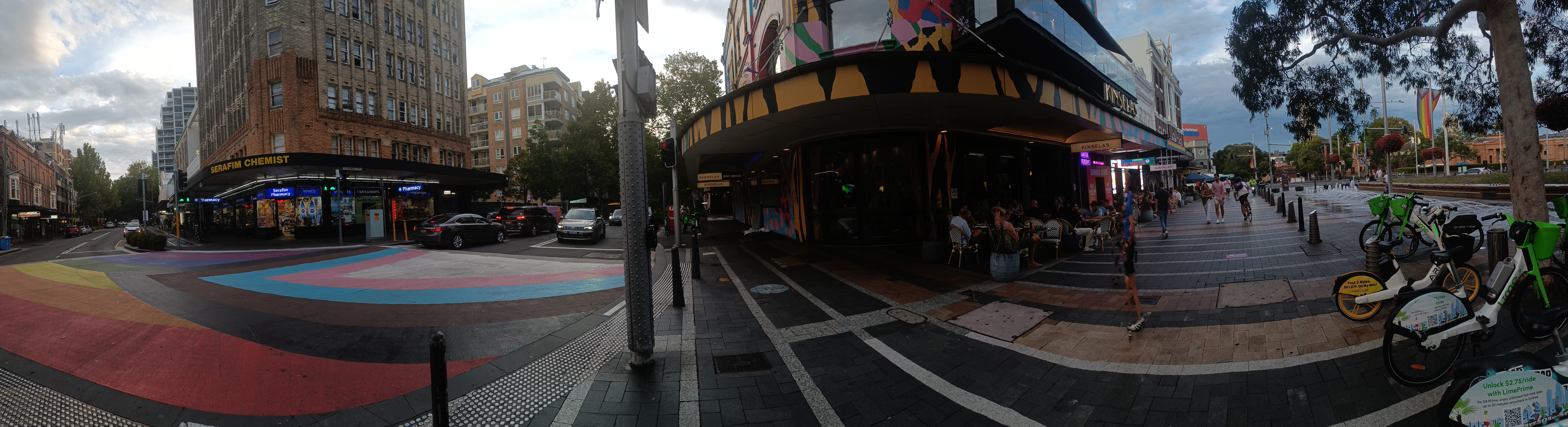
A new rainbow crossing was installed in 2019, and was updated in 2024 to include the progress pride flag. The crossing sits adjacent to the southern end of Taylor Square, on the corner of Campbell and Bourke streets, on the border between Surry Hills and Darlinghurst.

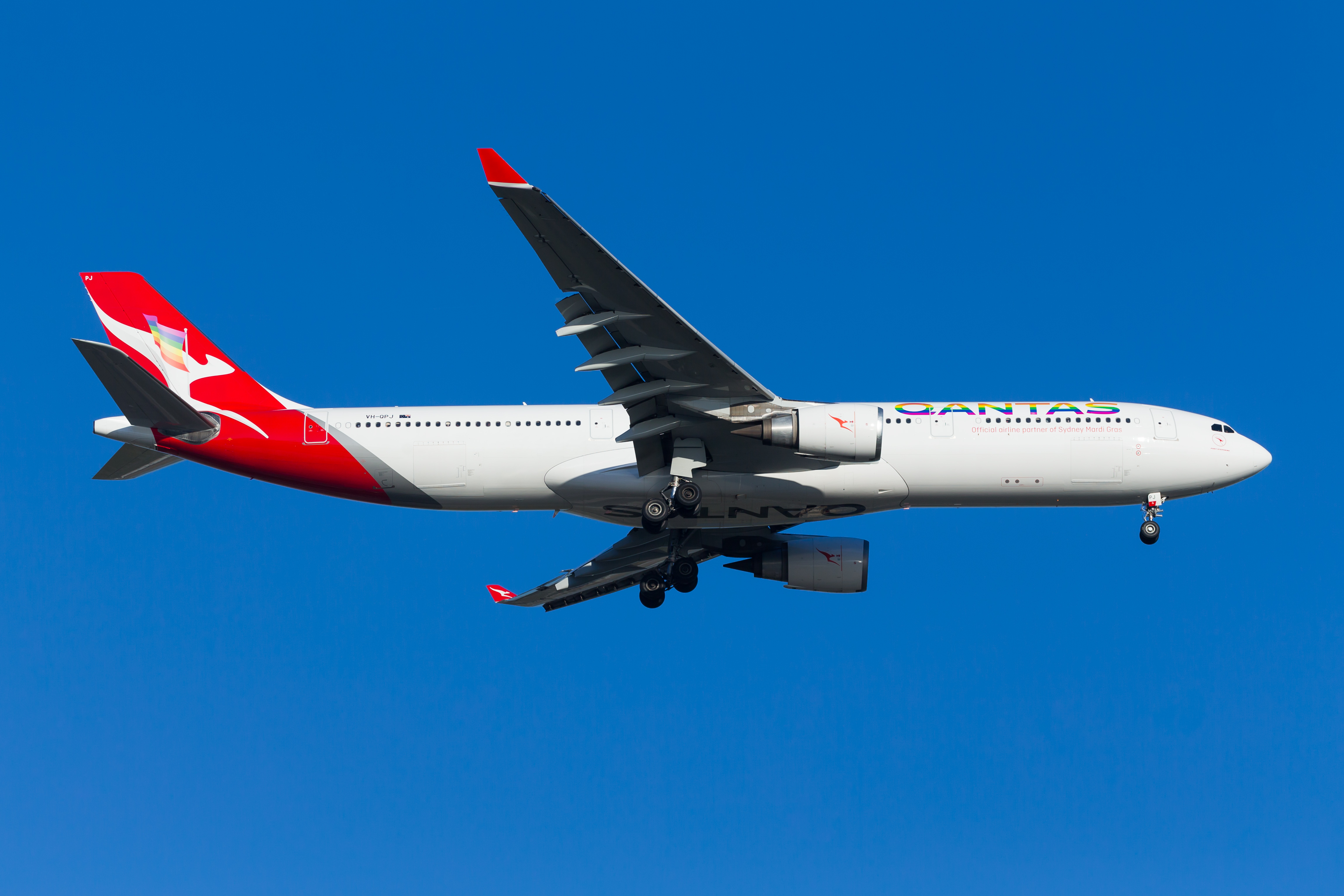
A rainbow flag visible on the tail of a Qantas Airbus A330-300 in 2017. As well as the rainbow flag the word Qantas is also painted in rainbow colours on the side of it. The airplane was dubbed the Gay330 or PrideRoo and the rainbow livery was displayed on it for a few months beginning in February 2017 as apart of Qantas's sponsorship of the 39th Mardi Gras.

Political support has come from a number of local and federal politicians such as former Australian Democrats Senator Natasha Stott Despoja and current Labor Senator Penny Wong, Members of the House of Representatives Tanya Plibersek and current Prime Minister Anthony Albanese, former Leader of the Opposition and Labor Party Bill Shorten Former Premier Barry O'Farrell as well as the present Lord Mayor of Sydney, Clover Moore. In 2023 Albanese became the first Prime Minister to march in Mardi Gras while in office. In 2024 Chris Minns became the first Premier of New South Wales to march in Mardi Gras.

As Prime Minister, Malcolm Turnbull attended the 2016 Mardi Gras but did not march. There was a movement by some Mardi Gras members to disinvite him in 2017 due to "lack of action" on same-sex marriage and his cuts to the Safe Schools program however the Sydney Gay and Lesbian Mardi Gras board subsequently rejected the move.

Hundreds of thousands of Australians and international guests come out in support of the Parade, with many lining up for a viewing spot from early in the afternoon. By the 7.45 pm Parade kick-off, crowds are usually ten-people deep. Though it has rained on several Mardi Gras parades (notably with heavy downpours prior to, and drizzle during, the parade in 1995, and heavy rainfall during the parade in 2004), this has never stopped the parade.

The Sydney Gay and Lesbian Mardi Gras is regarded internationally as one of the world's biggest and best LGBTQI marches and festivals, and has been described as an "absolute once-in-a-lifetime must for every travelling gay man". Mardi Gras is featured in the programmes of tour operators which target the gay market.

In the 2000s the Mardi Gras organisation struck financial trouble, and collapsed. This was attributed at the time to poor financial management and a downturn in international tourism following the attack on the World Trade Center in New York City, while another explanation was given as Australia's ongoing public liability crisis, which has seen massive insurance premiums impose a significant burden on community and public events, if not preventing them. As a consequence of the impending collapse of the organisation, there was a groundswell of concern and support within Sydney's LGBTQI communities for the continuation of the work and events of Mardi Gras. A series of crisis meetings culminated in the creation of a reformed organisation "New Mardi Gras" being formed to continue the Parade, the Festival & the Party.

In 2008, it was announced that the Government of New South Wales would provide funding for Mardi Gras as it had become part of the state's Master Events Calendar. Limited funds have also been sourced from the Sleaze Ball party held in Sydney towards the end of the year. Mardi Gras still receives significant public support and the event now receives some limited government funding.

In February 2013 a temporary rainbow crossing was installed between the southern and northern ends of Taylor Square on Oxford st by City of Sydney Council as part of Mardi Gras's 35th anniversary celebrations. The crossing was inspired by two rainbow crossings that were created in time for the 2012 LA Pride Parade and were located alongside the LA Pride Parade route on Santa Monica Boulevard, West Hollywood.

In April 2013 the crossing was removed as part of a condition with Roads & Maritime Services when the rainbow crossing was built. The crossing had been popular with tourists and local residents and soon after it was removed the DIY rainbow crossings movement emerged and was picked up on by the local and international media.

In 2019 a new permanent rainbow crossing was installed at the southern end of Taylor Square and this was updated in 2024 to include the progress pride flag. In 2025 a second permanent rainbow crossing with the progress pride flag was installed at the northern end of Taylor Square.

In 2026, the CEO decided to cancel the official after-party following large deficits for the organisation.

== See also ==
- LGBTQ culture in Sydney
- LGBT rights in Australia
- List of LGBT events
- Mardi Gras Film Festival
- Tourism in Sydney
- Culture of Sydney
- Ron Austin (one of the founders)
- Lance Gowland (one of the founders)
