= Vegas in Space =

- DVD cover
- Directed by: Phillip R. Ford
- Written by: Phillip R. Ford; Doris Fish
- Produced by: Phillip R. Ford
- Starring: Doris Fish; Tippi; Miss X Ramona Fischer; Lori Naslund
- Cinematography: Robin Clark
- Music by: Joshua Raoul Brody
- Distributed by: Troma Entertainment
- Release date: 1991
- Running time: 85 minutes
- Country: United States
- Language: English

Vegas in Space is a 1991 science fiction/comedy film directed by Phillip R. Ford and starring Doris Fish, Tippi, Miss X, Ramona Fischer, and Lori Naslund. The plot concerns three male space travelers who must become women in order to complete a secret mission on the all-female planet Clitoris. Deliberately campy, the film was written by Fish, one of Sydney's and San Francisco's notable drag queens. It was released by Troma Entertainment.

== Plot ==
Captain Dan Tracey and his two lieutenants are ordered to investigate trouble on the resort planet Clitoris, a pleasure world filled with shopping and gambling where, according to the Articles of the Venus Convention, only women are allowed. A variety of problems are occurring on the planet; most notably, several important pieces of Girlinium have been stolen from the Empress Nueva Gabor. Girlinium, as explained by the empress, is a very rare gem found only in the caverns of the fourth moon of Girlina, a distant planet. It is used by the empress to help the planet maintain its delicate orbit surrounding its sun. The stolen pieces must be found or the planet will fall into ruin as evidenced by increasingly violent earthquakes. The captain and his men, in order to remain undercover, become women via sex reversal pills and pose as showgirls from Earth performing a mid-20th century lounge act for the empress' annual off-world slumber party while investigating the crime.

== Production ==
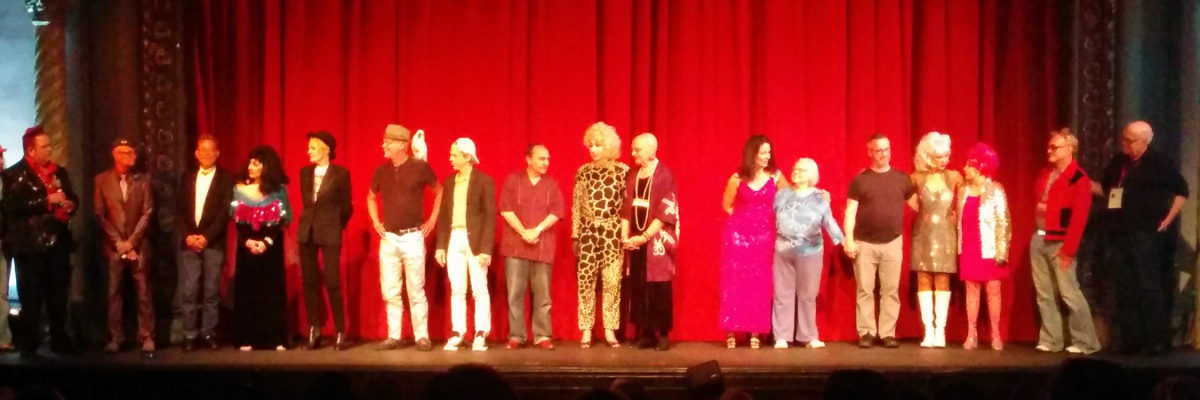
Phillip R. Ford (far left) with cast and crew of Vegas in Space in 2016

Executive producer/star Doris Fish and producer/director Phillip R. Ford struggled for years to assemble the sets, money, and equipment needed to make the movie. The principal photography of the movie spanned 18 months, but it took Fish and Ford eight years to raise the funds to complete the film. Doris Fish, who co-wrote the script and starred in the main role, also designed the sets, costumes, makeup and hair, and miniatures.

== See also ==
- List of Troma films
