= Linda Jackson (designer) =

Australian fashion designer and retailer

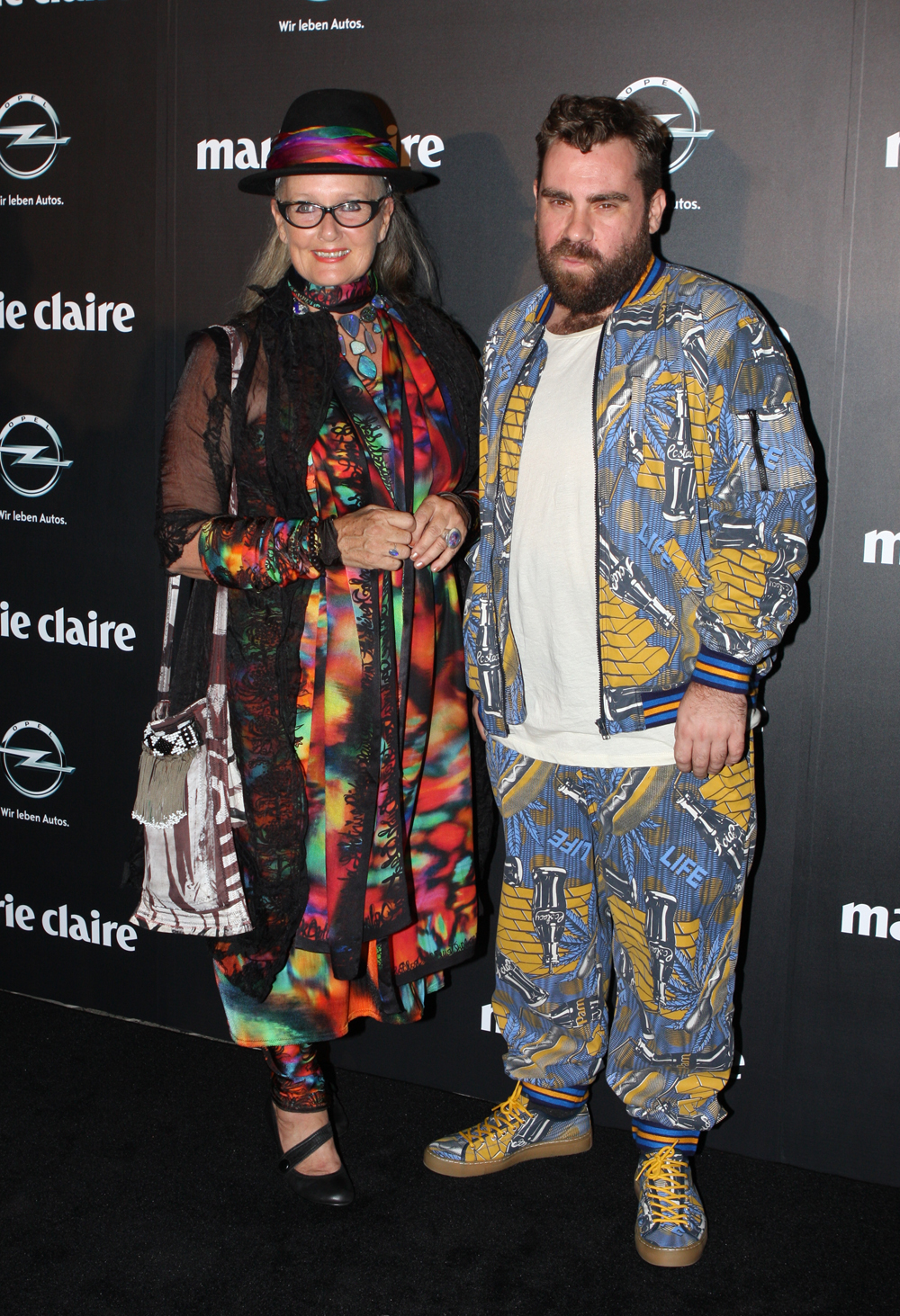
Linda Jackson with designer Luke Sales (2013)

Linda Jackson AO (born 15 September 1950) is an Australian fashion designer, fashion retailer and artist.

== Biography ==
Jackson was born in Melbourne bay side suburb of Beaumaris. Her parents were ballroom dancers and encouraged her creative instincts. She studied fashion and design at the Emily McPherson College (now part of RMIT), and photography in Melbourne. In 1966 she left to travel in Asia and Europe. She regarded these travels as her "university of life". She travelled through Papua New Guinea, Asia and onto Europe and England. Jackson returned to Sydney in 1972 after working as a dressmaker in London. She visited workshops and collecting the fashions of Parisian couturiers, studying how to cut on the bias, drape and other intricacies of hand-made clothing such as hand-rolled silk hems. Her favourites were Vionnet and Paul Poiret. Jackson favoured quality fabrics such as tafetta, crepe de chine, chiffon and silk georgette.

After meeting designer Jenny Kee in 1973 at an exhibition opening at the Bonython Gallery in Sydney, they established a business partnership and opened Flamingo Park Frock Salon, a boutique in The Strand Arcade, Sydney in 1973. She remained partners with Kee until 1982 when Jackson created the Bush Couture and Bush Kids labels.

This period also saw Jackson collaborate with artists Bruce Gould, Deborah Leser, David McDiarmid and Peter Tully, who hand-painted fabrics for Jackson's dresses and provided jewellery to complement her outfits.

In 1989, Jackson was back in the spotlight, designing an accessory range for Oroton which incorporated the Australian designs she had so favoured while designing for Flamingo Park: the desert pea, waratah, gum leaves, scribbly gum and birds in the bush. In the foreword to her book Linda Jackson: The Art of Fashion, June McCallum, then editor-in-chief of Vogue, summed up Jackson's clothes as 'wonderfully witty, beautiful pieces that are imaginative, inventive and exciting to wear."

In the 1990s, Jackson relocated to Arnhem Land living and working with Aboriginal communities. She spent time in Queensland with the artists of the Mossman Gorge, creating hand-painted silk scarves. Jackson also exhibited regularly as a painter and photographer.

In 2019, the Powerhouse Museum staged an extensive survey of the work of Jackson and former collaborator Jenny Kee. The work included in the exhibition was drawn from the collection of the Powerhouse Museum, as well as works from the personal collections of both Jackson and Kee. Jackson said of their creative partnership:

We have tried to capture the pride we felt for Australia when we returned in the 1970s and the way its unique environment has inspired us over the years. Jenny and I have always shared a love for colour, vibrancy, flora, fauna and the bush, and we’ve aimed to bring this to life in our designs.

== Selected exhibitions ==
- 1985-86: Linda Jackson and Jenny Kee: Flamingo Park and Bush Couture, National Gallery of Australia, Canberra
- 1989: Australian Fashion: the Contemporary Art Victoria and Albert Museum, London, Korea and Japan
- 2012: Bush Couture, National Gallery of Victoria, Melbourne
- 2019: Step Into Paradise, Powerhouse Museum, Sydney; with Jenny Kee
- 2025: Know My Name: Kee, Jackson and Delaunay, National Gallery of Australia, Canberra

== Awards and recognition ==
- 1977: Fashion Industry of Australia Lyre Bird Awards (Innovators category); joint winner with Jenny Kee
- 2018: Officer of the Order of Australia for services to the Australian fashion industry

== Influences ==
Jackson was influenced in the late 1960s and 1970s by designer Peter Tully, artist activist David McDiarmid and fashion designer Clarence Chai. Later she was influenced by her experience of the Australian outback and the work of indigenous Australian artists, traditional textiles of Papua New Guinea and the traditional beading of Kenya.
