= Jenny Kee =

Australian fashion designer (born 1947)

Jenny Kee AO
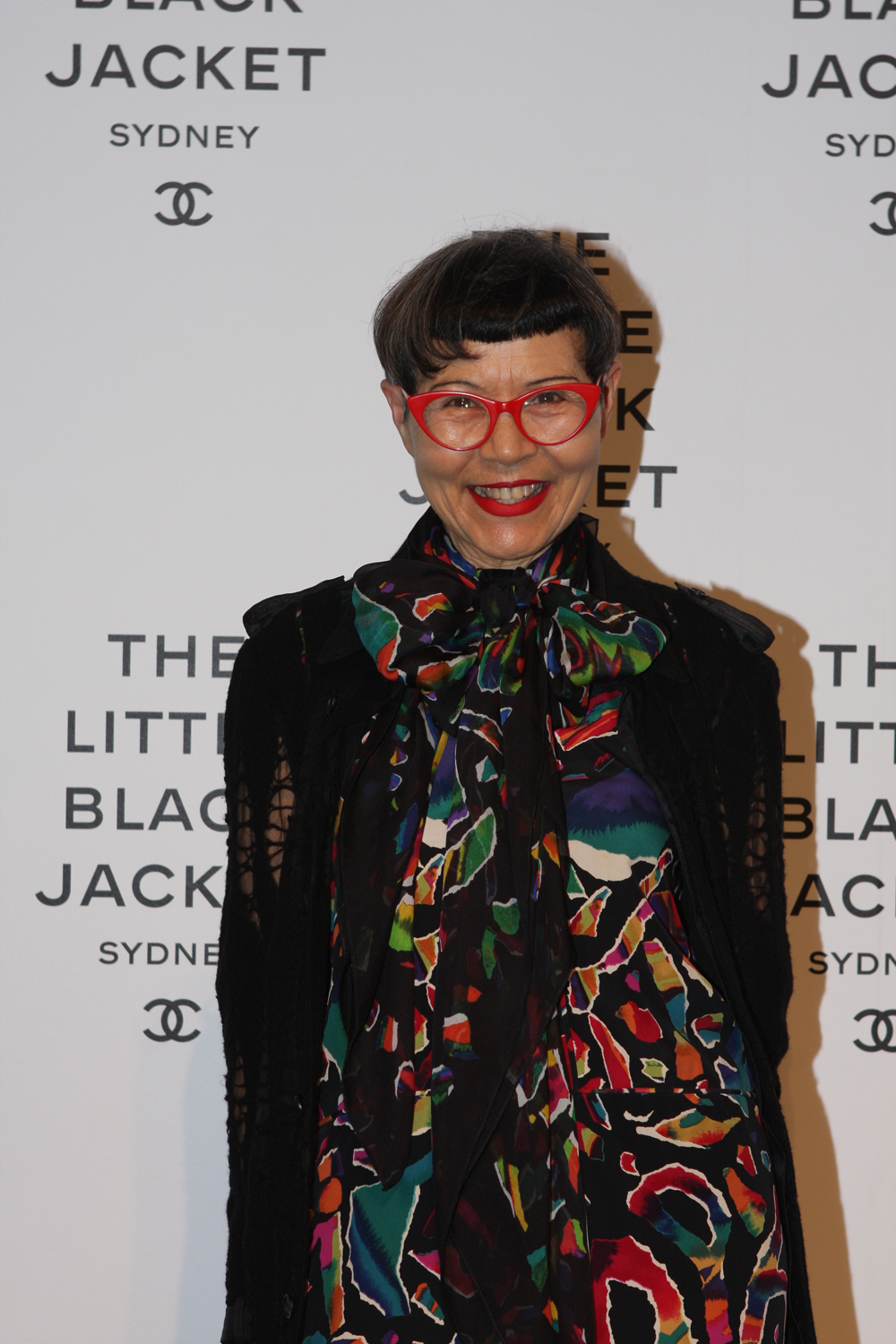
- Jenny Kee in October 2012
- Born: Jennifer Margaret Kee; 24 January 1947 (age 79); Bondi, New South Wales, Australia
- Occupation: Fashion designer
- Label: Flamingo Park
- Awards: Officer of the Order of Australia (2018)

Jenny Margaret Kee, AO (born 24 January 1947) is an Australian fashion designer.

== Early life ==
Kee was born on 24 January 1947 in Bondi, New South Wales, Australia, to an Australian Born Chinese father and a sixth-generation Australian mother of Italian-English descent. Kee's great-grandparents had migrated from Guangdong, China, to Cooktown, Queensland during the 1870s gold rush. Kee attended East Sydney Technical College but did not complete her studies in fashion there. At age 18, she left Sydney for London. She started her career in fashion in modelling, at one time featuring as the face of Canadian Pacific Air Lines advertisements.

== Career ==
In 1965, Kee moved to London, England, and became involved in the Swinging London and underground scene, where she sold second-hand clothing to hippies at the Chelsea Antique Market for Vern Lambert. In 1972 she returned to Australia, and in 1973 opened a fashion boutique, Flamingo Park. and started collaborating with fashion and textile designer Linda Jackson to create a national fashion identity. They formed a partnership creating outfits including bright and colourful pure Australian wool knitted jumpers with fauna and flora emblems. Among them was a knitted koala jumper nicknamed "Blinky" that was owned by Diana, Princess of Wales, who wore it to a polo game at Windsor Castle in 1982. The waratah also featured strongly in her work. In October 1982, Karl Lagerfeld incorporated a couple of Kee's designs for his first Chanel collection. Kee and Jackson collaborated with artists such as David McDiarmid and Peter Tully, who hand-painted fabrics for Jackson's dresses and provided jewellery to complement her outfits. Located in The Strand Arcade in Sydney's central business district, the boutique closed in 1995.

In 2006, she published her autobiography and account of her life in the Swinging London scene, titled A Big Life. In May 2012, she launched her first solo show in more than three decades at the Mercedes-Benz Fashion Week Australia. In 2013, Kee was awarded the Australian Fashion Laureate. In 2015, she partnered with Woolmark to launch an Australian merino capsule collection inspired by her past designs, including the jumper worn by Princess Diana. In March 2016, Kee's work with Jackson was showcased in the National Gallery of Victoria's exhibition on "200 Years of Australian Fashion". In 2018, Kee was appointed an Officer of the Order of Australia (AO). In 2019 the combined works of Jenny Kee and Linda Jackson were displayed at The Powerhouse Museum in Sydney, NSW.

== Personal life ==
In 1977, Kee married Australian artist Michael Ramsden; they divorced after 21 years. She was also in a long-term relationship with artist Danton Hughes, son of the art critic Robert Hughes. Danton Hughes died by suicide in their Blackheath home in 2001. Kee and her daughter Grace are survivors of the Granville rail disaster. In the 1980s, Kee became acquainted with Tibetan Buddhism; in a 2016 interview with ABC News, she described the Bardo Thodol as her Bible.

== Depictions ==
Kee features in a memoir by Richard Neville, editor of the Australian satirical magazine Oz, and is portrayed by Nina Liu in the unreleased British film adaptation of Neville's work, Hippie Hippie Shake.
