= Peter Tully =

Australian artist (1947–1992)

- Born: Peter Craig Tully; 1947; Carlton, Victoria, Australia
- Died: 1992 (aged 44–45); Paris, France
- Education: Self-taught; jewellery training in Melbourne
- Occupations: Artist; jewellery designer; costume designer; Artistic Director (Sydney Gay and Lesbian Mardi Gras)
- Years active: 1970s–1992
- Known for: Jewellery design; wearable art; costume design; urban tribalwear
- Notable work: Urban Tribalwear; Passion for Plastics; Mardi Gras costumes and floats
- Movement: Australian contemporary art; queer art; wearable art
- Partner: David McDiarmid (1973-1975)

Peter Tully (1947-1992), was an Australian jewellery designer, costume maker, visual artist, and gay-community activist whose work became central to the development of the distinctive aesthetic "urban tribalwear," which combines plastics, found materials, global street culture, and queer performance traditions. He collaborated extensively with designers Linda Jackson, Jenny Kee, and David McDiarmid, and acted as Artistic Director of the Sydney Gay and Lesbian Mardi Gras from 1982 to 1986. Tully's work is held all over the Country in major Australian collection including the Powerhouse Museum, the National Gallery of Victoria, and the National Gallery of Australia.

== Early life and education ==
Tully was born Peter Craig Tutungi in Carlton, Melbourne on 17 December 1947 to Sydney-born father Alfred Henry Tutungi and Melbourne-born Elva Merla, née Foza. When he was at the age of five the family anglicised their Arabic name to the more acceptable Tully and moved Lorne, Victoria where he attended local primary and high schools. At the age of seventeen, Tully returned to Melbourne, where he found work as a window dresser and prop-maker for Cann's Pty Ltd and Public Benefit Shoes, this is where he gained experience in display, materials, and theatrical presentation.

In 1974, Tully attended Melbourne State College for a part-time jewellery course, it was here that he was able to experiment with different non-traditional materials.

In 1976, he attended Randwick Technical College to begin a certificate course in jewellery design, Tully never completed this course.

== Travels ==
In 1968 and 1969, Tully along with Murray Kelly, Clarence Chai, and Paul Craft, resided in a gay group-household at Carlton, Victoria. It was during this time that he began creating unique party costumes made from materials he was able to source from second-hand retailers.

In the 1970s, Tully travelled extensively through Europe, the Middle East, Africa, and Asia both independently as well as accompanied by the fashion designer Linda Jackson and her partner, the photographer Fran Moore. His encounters with street markets, jewellery traditions, ceremonial dress, and local material culture strongly influenced his later work. He drew inspiration from Egyptian bazaars, Papua New Guinean adornment, Indian ornamentation, and global urban fashion, working these influences into a personal aesthetic he later termed "urban tribalwear."

In 1971, Tully arrived in Paris, where he taught English, and undertook trips to the Netherlands and Spain. It was in Paris that Tully became particularly impressed by the collections of African and Oceanic art. By 1973, he made his way back to Melbourne, where he started creating jewellery influenced by the cultures he experienced during his travels.

== Career ==
In 1974, Tully and McDiarmid travelled through South-East Asia before returning to Australia to live in Sydney in 1975, joining their Melbourne friends and creative collaborators Linda Jackson, and her partner Fran Moore, who had moved there in 1973. This period also saw McDiarmid, Tully and Jackson collaborating with Melbourne fashion designer and retailer Clarence Chai and Sydney-based fashion designer and retailer Jenny Kee. After their move to Sydney with Tully and McDiarmid were soon involved with Kee's fashion store Flamingo Park in Strand Arcade, hand-painting fabrics for Jackson’s dresses.

He once said of the legendary Paradise Garage disco in New York: 'It was about 85% black and very exciting. They played the best music I'd never heard and the people dressed. Even though they didn't dress expensively, they had lots of style. They could wear a paper bag and look like a million dollars. And they really impressed me. So that was the impetus to get into costume.'

=== Urban Tribalwear ===
In the late 1970s and early 1980s Tully developed the concept of "urban tribalwear". The works he created combined the use of plastics, found objects, bricolage, and bold colour with references to global street cultures and queer performance. He created wearable pieces that blurred the boundaries between fashion, sculture, and costume, he did this through his rejection of conventional jewellery materials, instead favouring industrial plastics, recycled objects, and mass produced components.

His experience of traditional tribal cultures through many years of travel in New Guinea, Africa and India - along with the vibrant and creative urban sub-cultural 'tribes' he saw in New York - stimulated the development of his 'urban tribalwear'.

Tully's jewellery and wearable works were often larger in scale, theatrical, and designed primarily for performance contexts. Through his work he challenges the traditional hierarchies of fine art and craft, positioning wearable art as a site of cultural commentary and queer expression.

=== Collaborations ===
Tully collaborated closely with designers Linda Jackson and Jenny Kee, contributing jewellery, accessories, and costume elements to their fashion collections and performances. His partnership with McDiarmid was also significant; the two shared aesthetic interests in plastics, queer identity, and global cultural references.

=== Sydney Gay and Lesbian Mardi Gras ===
Tully was undoubtedly the most influential designer involved with the Sydney Gay and Lesbian Mardi Gras, through his role as artistic director from 1982-1986 and through the establishment and management of the Workshop. It was in these roles that Tully greatly contributed to the transformation of the Mardi Gras from a political march to cultural event.

He played a major role in shaping the parade's visual identity, encouraging community groups to adopt bold, imaginative, and politically expressive costume and float designs. His influence helped to establish Mardi Gras as a major site of queer artistic innovation in Australia.

Tully's Mardi Gras work emphasised inclusivity, creativity, and the transformative power of costume. He encouraged participants to use recycled materials, plastics, and handmade adornment, reflecting his own artistic philosophy.(3)

=== Exhibitions ===
Tully exhibited widely throughout the 1980s and early 1990s. Major exhibitions included Urban Tribalwear, Passion for Plastics, and various wearable art and jewellery shows in Sydney and Melbourne. His work was featured in galleries, fashion events, and queer cultural festivals.

In 1977, Tully held his second one-man exhibition, exhibiting his Australiana-themed jewellery at Paraphethana Gallery.

=== Collections ===
Tully's work is held in several major Australian public colelctions, including:

- Powerhouse Museum, Sydney - extensive holdings of jewellery, wearable art, and Mardi Gras material
- National Gallery of Victoria - jewellery and waerable pieces
- National Gallery of Australia - selected works

=== Style and Themes ===
Tully's work is charaterised by:

- Use of plastics, industrial material, and found objects
- Bricolage and assemblage techniques
- References to global street culture and ceremonial dress
- queer identity, performance, and carnival aesthetics
- bold colour, humour, and theatricality
- His practice sits at the intersection of craft, fashion, sculpture, and queer cultural production.

== Legacy ==
Peter Tully is regarded as a pioneering figure in Australian wearable art and queer visual culture. His "urban tribalwear" aesthetic influenced generations of designers and performers, and his contributions to Mardi Gras helped establish the parade as a major cultural event. Scholars such as Sally Gray have highlighted Tully's role in shaping queer artistic expression in Australia.

Posthumous exhibitions and retrospectives have reinforced his significance within Australian art history, and his influence remains visible in contemporary jewellery, costume design, and queer performance.

== Personal life and death ==
In 1973, Tully met the artist and activist David McDiarmid, becoming lovers for the following two years, and remaining friends and collaborators till Tully's death in 1992; McDiarmid had influenced Tully artistically as well as politically.

Tully died at the age of 45 in Paris on 10 August 1992 due to AIDS-related conditions, he was then cremated. His work continues to be celebrated for its innovation, cultural hybridity, and contribution to queer artistic identity in Australia.

== Exhibitions ==
=== Solo exhibitions ===
- "Passion for Plastics" Peter Tully at Aces Art Shop 144 Edgecliff Road Woollahra NSW opened 12 December 1976
- "Passion for Plastics" Peter Tully at Paraphernalia Gallery Melbourne, opened 24 April 1977 -see citation above to Pat von Wolff fashion editor of The Age in her article of 25 April 1977 called Plastic Fashion
- "Living Plastics" Jewellery by Peter Tully (and An Australian Dream Lounge by David McDiarmid ) Hogarth Galleries Paddington NSW 6–24 December 1977
- "New Works " by Peter Tully and David McDiarmid Hogarth Galleries Paddington NSW 11 November -1 December 1978
- "Urban Tribalwear" by Peter Tully Crafts Council of Australia 113 George St Sydney 22 November to 22 December 1980
- "Florescents " by Peter Tully Hieroglyphics Gallery 135 crown St East Sydney 3–17 December 1981
- "Solo Survey" Queen Victoria Museum and Art Gallery, Launceston, Tasmania. 1982 (See solo survey linkage project Tasmanian School of Art UTAS )
- "Primitive Futures" by Peter Tully (with David McDiarmid "New Work") Roslyn Oxley9 Gallery 20 May -16 June 1984
- "Treasures of the Last Future" Barry Stern Galleries Paddington NSW 1–23 December 1990
- "Urban Tribalwear and Beyond" Peter Tully retrospective for the Australian National Gallery (now National Gallery of Australia) in Canberra at the Drill Hall Gallery. Curated by John McPhee 6 July - 22 September 1991. The first retrospective by a living artist that the then ANG now NGA ever did.

=== Group exhibitions ===
- "An Exhibition of work by Homosexual and Lesbian Artists" 23–24 July 1978, Watters Gallery, Sydney. The exhibition included a fundraiser for the 4th National Homosexual Conference to be held in August 1978 at Paddington Town Hall, Sydney NSW. Other artists included David McDiarmid, Vivienne Binns, Frances Budden, Sally Colechin, Doug Erskine, Bill Morley and Robert Lawrie.
- "Art Clothes " Art Gallery of NSW (AGNSW) 20 December 1980 – 1 February 1981
- "Gay Mardi Gras Exhibition 1985" Print Source Gallery Oxford St Darlinghurst NSW February - March 1985
- "Nine Artists" Barry Stern Gallery Glenmore Rd Paddington NSW 15 February-19 March 1992 ( for Sydney Gay and Lesbian Mardi Gras)
- "You Are Here" Martin Browne Fine Art 11 gay male artists for Sydney Gay and Lesbian Mardi Gras Festival 6–28 February 1993 Curated by Scott Redford and Luke Roberts. Previously shown at Institute of Modern Art (IMA) in Brisbane in November 1992. Artists were Peter Tully, David McDiarmid, Luke Roberts, Scott Redford, Leonard Brown, Peter Cooley, Brent Harris, Ross Wallace, Hiram To, Matthew Jones and Bashir Baraki.
- "From Eltham to Memphis" Craft Victoria Gallery Melbourne VIC, 7 September 2000 to 14 October 2000.
- Dead Gay Artists, Tin Sheds Gallery, 1–23 February 2002 Curator Robert Lake.
- Sydney Gay Mardi Gras Museum Exhibition to celebrate 35 years of the Sydney Gay and Lesbian Mardi Gras, drawing on the extensive holdings of the Australian Lesbian and Gay Archives (ALGA). At 94 Oxford St Darlinghurst NSW 2010 from 29 January 2013 to ?.February 2013.
- Mix Tape 1980s: Appropriation, Subculture, Critical Style, National Gallery of Victoria, 11 April–1 September 2013
