= Fran Moore =

American former CIA executive

Fran Moore is an American former Central Intelligence Agency executive. Her positions at the agency included Director of Analysis from 2010 to 2014, Deputy Director of Intelligence, Deputy Director of Analytic Programs, Director and Deputy Director of Terrorism Analysis in the Counterterrorism Center, and Chief and Deputy Chief of Counterintelligence Analysis.
