= List of Terence Stamp performances =

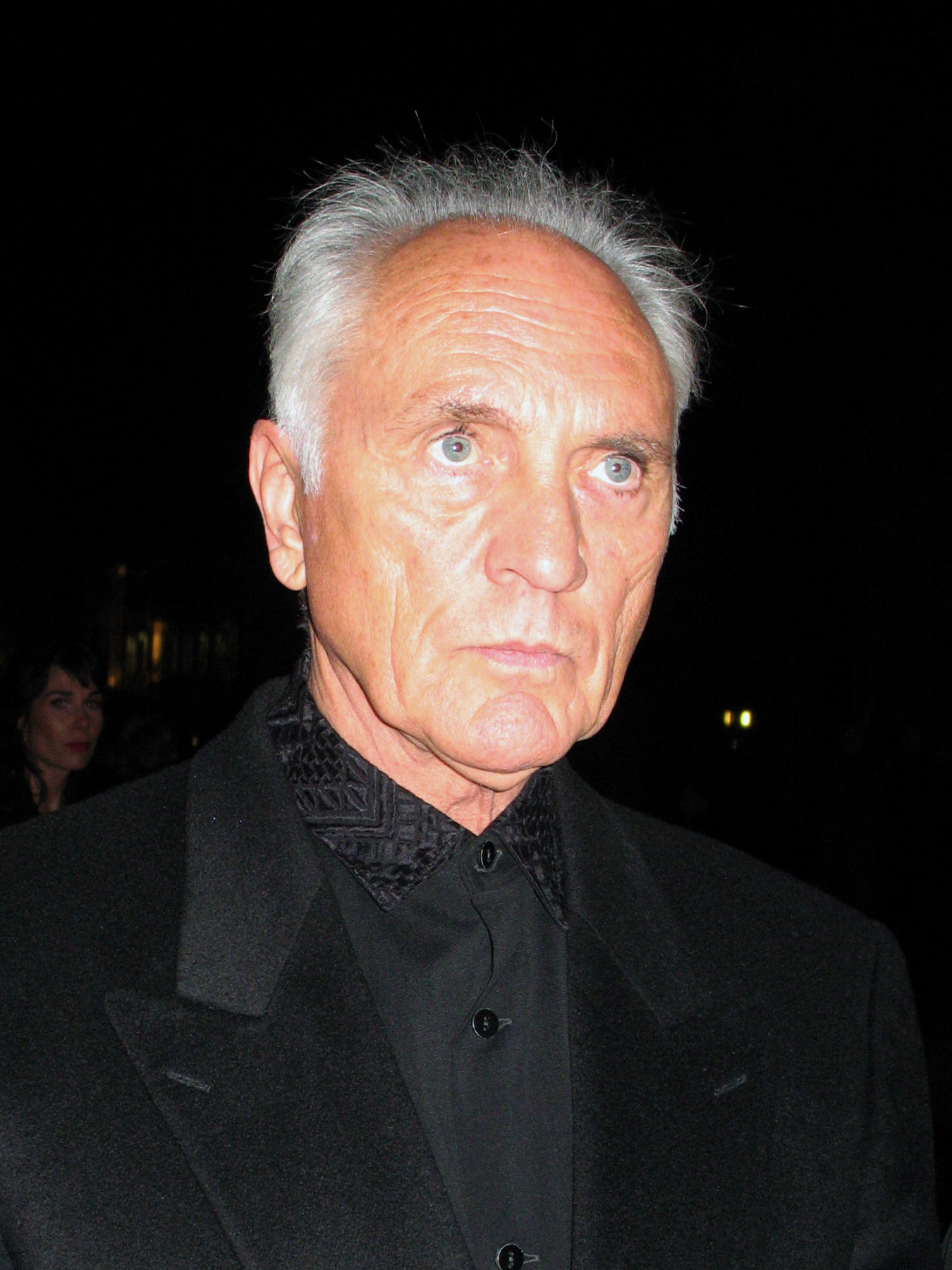
Stamp at the Berlin premiere of Valkyrie in 2009

Terence Henry Stamp (1938–2025) was an English actor. During his career, Stamp received various accolades including a Golden Globe Award, a Cannes Film Festival Award as well as nominations for an Academy Award and two BAFTA Awards.

Stamp was known for his film roles in Billy Budd (1962), The Collector (1965), Modesty Blaise (1966), Superman (1978), Superman II (1980), The Adventures of Priscilla, Queen of the Desert (1994), The Limey (1999), Wall Street (1987), Young Guns (1988), Star Wars: Episode I – The Phantom Menace (1999), The Haunted Mansion (2003), Elektra (2005), Wanted (2008), Get Smart (2008), Yes Man (2008), Valkyrie (2008), Song for Marion (2012), and Big Eyes (2014).

== Performances ==
=== Film ===
Year	Title	Role	Notes
1962	Billy Budd	Billy Budd	
1962	Term of Trial	Mitchell	
1965	The Collector	Freddie Clegg	
1966	Modesty Blaise	Willie Garvin	
1967	Poor Cow	Dave Fuller	
1967	Far from the Madding Crowd	Sgt. Francis 'Frank' Troy	
1968	Blue	Blue	
1968	Spirits of the Dead	Toby Dammit	
1968	Teorema	The Visitor	
1970	The Mind of Mr. Soames	John Soames	
1971	A Season in Hell	Arthur Rimbaud	
1975	The Divine Nymph	Dany di Bagnasco	
1975	Hu-man	Terence	
1976	Striptease	Alain	
1977	Black-Out	Edgar Poe	
1978	Superman	General Zod	
1979	Meetings with Remarkable Men	Prince Lubovedsky	
1979	Together?	Henry	
1980	Superman II	General Zod	
1981	Jules Verne's Mystery on Monster Island	J.R. Taskinar/Skinner	
1982	Morte in Vaticano	Padre Andreani, later Pope Giovanni Clemente I	
1984	The Hit	Willie Parker	
1984	The Company of Wolves	The Devil	Uncredited
1986	Legal Eagles	Victor Taft	
1986	Link	Dr. Steven Phillip	
1986	Hud	Edward	
1987	The Sicilian	Prince Borsa	
1987	Wall Street	Sir Larry Wildman	
1988	Young Guns	John Tunstall	
1988	Alien Nation	William Harcourt	
1990	Genuine Risk	Paul Hellwart	
1991	Beltenebros	Darman	
1993	The Real McCoy	Jack Schmidt	
1994	The Adventures of Priscilla, Queen of the Desert	Bernadette Bassenger	
1994	Mindbender	Joe Hartman	
1996	Limited Edition	Edward Lamb	(Tiré à Part)
1997	Love Walked In	Fred Moore	
1997	Bliss	Baltazar	
1999	The Limey	Wilson	
1999	Star Wars: Episode I – The Phantom Menace	Supreme Chancellor Finis Valorum	
1999	Bowfinger	Terry Stricter	
1999	Kiss the Sky	Kozen	
2000	Red Planet	Dr. Bud Chantilas	
2001	Revelation	Magnus Martel	
2001	My Wife Is an Actress	John	
2002	Full Frontal	Man on Plane/Himself	
2002	Fellini: I'm a Born Liar	Himself	Documentary
2003	My Boss's Daughter	Jack Taylor	
2003	The Kiss	Philip Naudet	
2003	The Haunted Mansion	Ramsley	
2004	Dead Fish	Samuel Fish	
2005	Elektra	Stick	
2005	These Foolish Things	Baker	
2006	September Dawn	Brigham Young	
2006	Superman II: The Richard Donner Cut	General Zod	
2008	Wanted	Pekwarsky	
2008	Flowers and Weeds	Storyteller	
2008	Get Smart	Siegfried	
2008	Yes Man	Terrence Bundley	
2008	Valkyrie	Ludwig Beck	
2010	Ultramarines: A Warhammer 40,000 Movie	Captain Severus	Voice
2011	The Adjustment Bureau	Thompson	
2012	Song for Marion	Arthur	
2013	The Art of the Steal	Samuel Winter	
2014	Big Eyes	John Canaday	
2016	Miss Peregrine's Home for Peculiar Children	Abraham "Abe" Portman	
2017	Crooked House	Chief Inspector Taverner	
2017	Bitter Harvest	Ivan	
2018	Viking Destiny	Odin	
2019	Murder Mystery	Malcolm Quince	
2021	Last Night in Soho	The Silver Haired Gentleman	
TBA	Priscilla Queen of the Desert 2	Bernadette Bassenger	Filming

=== Television ===
Year	Title	Role	Notes
1978	The Thief of Baghdad	Wazir Jaudur	Television film
1983	Chessgame	David Audley	
1986	The Cold War Killers	David Audley	Television film
1997–98	The Hunger	Host	
2003–11	Smallville	Jor-El (AI)	23 episodes
2003	Static Shock	Dennis/Professor Menace	Voice, episode: "Blast from the Past"
2020	His Dark Materials	Giacomo Paradisi	Episode: "Tower of the Angels"

=== Theatre ===
Year	Title	Role	Venue	Ref.
1959	The Long and the Short and the Tall	Private Samuel "Sammy" Whitaker	UK Tour	
1960	This Year, Next Year	Charlie	Vaudeville Theatre, West End	
1964–65	Alfie!	Alfie	Morosco Theatre, Broadway	
1978	Dracula	Count Dracula	Shaftesbury Theatre, West End	
1979	The Lady from the Sea	A Stranger	Roundhouse, West End	

=== Video games ===
Year	Title	Role	Notes	Ref.
2004	The Getaway: Black Monday	Narrator	Narrated the behind-the-scenes video for the game	
2006	The Elder Scrolls IV: Oblivion	Mankar Camoran		
2007	Halo 3	Prophet of Truth	Replaced Michael Wincott	
2009	Wanted: Weapons of Fate	Pekwarsky		
2025	The Elder Scrolls IV: Oblivion Remastered	Mankar Camoran	Archival recordings	
