= Lance Leopard =

Gay columnist and performer (1967–2024)

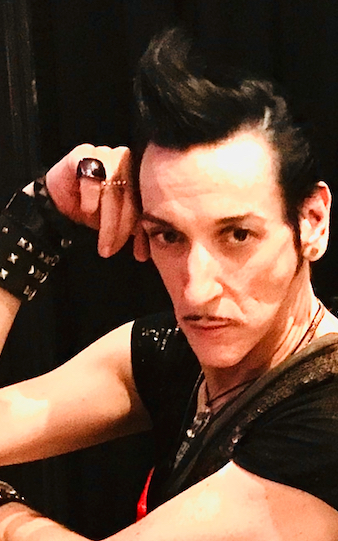
- At Madd Club, 2019, Sydney.
- Born: Marc Philip Pierce; 11 March 1967; Deception Bay, Queensland, Australia
- Died: 16 June 2024 (aged 57); Brisbane, Queensland, Australia
- Occupations: Writer, club event promoter, make-up artist, performer

Signature
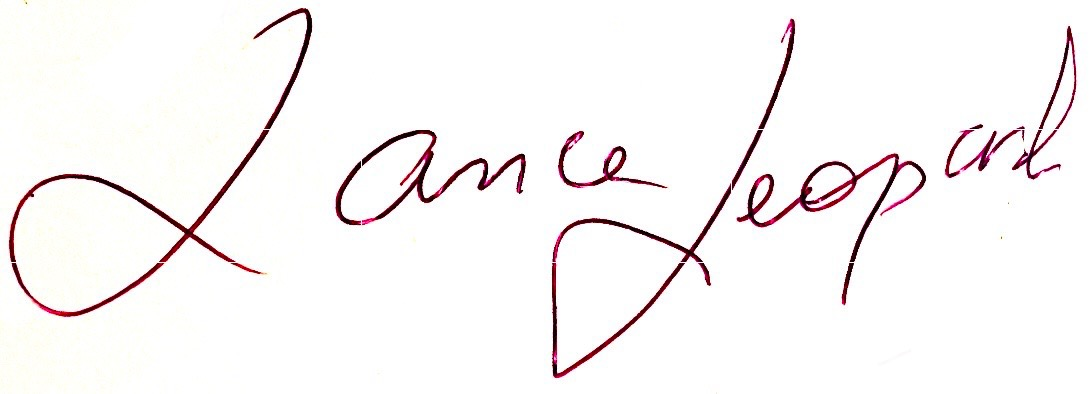

Lance Leopard (born Marc Philip Pierce; 11 March 1967 – 16 June 2024) was a writer, club event promoter, performer and make-up artist. He wrote weekly columns in the 1990s about gay and lesbian culture and nightlife on Oxford Street's "Golden Mile", Sydney, during the peak AIDS era.

He mostly worked for free LGBTIQA+ street newspapers Capital Q and the Sydney Star Observer, glossy gay magazines Outrage and Campaign, and music newspaper On The Street.

In addition to his writing, Leopard was a make-up artist for drag queens, an event promoter and emceed many community fundraisers, including Mardi Gras events and for HIV/AIDS awareness. He also performed in a New Romantic band and had small roles in television and short films.

== Early career ==
=== 1981: Developing his fashion style and looks at nightclubs ===
In 1981 when Leopard was 14 he went to The Terminus and Marilyn's nightclubs, which attracted gay crowds, outsiders and young fashionistas who took pride in wearing the latest hairstyles and creating their own looks.

In person, he had "the dramatic sense of Elizabeth Taylor, the social skills of Princess Lee Radziwill", "the voice of Rex Harrison" and "the substance capacity of Liza Minnelli". "He was Quentin Crisp, Tennessee Williams, and Joan Collins, à la Alexis, rolled into one."

He loved the traditional gay passions, "high and low", of popular culture icons, acerbic writers, Hollywood movie stars in old black and white movies, and taught his friends to learn the names of all "Zsa Zsa's nine husbands".

Leopard was noted in the Queensland Museum's "Make a Scene: Fashioning Queer Identity and Club Culture in the '90s" exhibition as a "bon vivant" and make-up artist for both the Glamourpussy fashion label and Kylie Minogue impersonator Adrian Barker. They wore the label's outfits, which added a sense of "camp energy and theatricality" to their nightclub appearances.

At 15, Leopard left school, as he felt he didn't need further education to "be a star".

=== 1982: Joined the MegaMen ===
In 1982 Leopard played electronic drums when he joined New Romantic band The MegaMen in Brisbane, with Mark Love on synthesiser and Zhian (Clyde Behm) as lead singer. They were the resident band at Marilyn's nightclub. Their 1983 single, Designed for Living, was a "cult-classic hit", which they performed on television for the Brisbane Telethon fundraiser and they supported national acts The Reels and Deckchairs Overboard.

"That band, The MegaMen, made me an overnight star," Leopard wrote. "Limousines were as natural to me as the air that I breathed by the time I was 17. But I was a has-been by the age of 18."

Leopard performed at two MegaMen reunions: in October 2012 at St Paul's Tavern, Brisbane, and in 2014 at the Brisbane Powerhouse for record label Transmission Communications' book launch of BNE – The Definitive Archive: Brisbane Independent Electronic Music Production 1979–2014. The Designed for Living single was selected for an American compilation of gay electronica in 2024.

=== 1984–early 1990s: Adopted new name, moved to Sydney, eventually into Nevada Studios (known for its parties) ===
In 1984, he adopted the Lance Leopard name from a character in one of his favourite books, Patrick Dennis' parody novel Little Me, a camp send-up of celebrity culture.

Leopard moved to Sydney in 1985 and dabbled in "art, singing, drugs, booze. Mostly socialising". He worked as a make-up artist and stylist and ended up in an artists' collective, Nevada Studios, in 1992, with talented costume creator Brenton Heath-Kerr (who died of AIDS-related complications at the age of 33 on 1 July 1995).

Nevada Studios was known for its parties, such as New Year's Eve 1993 Poseidon Adventure, where drag queen Bernina Bod (Brett Chamberlain) sang Diana Ross' Upside Down with tables, chairs and a Christmas tree attached to the ceiling.

Leopard performed as crooning singer "Lance Vegas" at Nevada's Studio 50Whore party. Artist-activist David McDiarmid (1952–1995), who enjoyed fabulous parties in New York from 1979 to 1987, described: "Nevada New Year's Eve was wild ... "

In 1993, Leopard exhibited ten portraits of drag queens Cindy Pastel, Lady Bump, Maude Boate, pop singer Marcia Hines and other inner city performers, in a joint art exhibition All Style No Substance with artist Darian Zam at Nevada Studios, from 15 to 27 December.

== Writing: 1993 to 2000 ==
Leopard began as a television and video reviewer for the Capital Q weekly free newspaper in April 1993, and added a social column in 19 August 1994. He was poached by the Sydney Star Observer, where he wrote from 30 May 1996 to 18 September 1997, finishing his last column with half a sentence. The next day, his column in Capital Q started with the rest of the same sentence. His last column appeared on 17 November 2000 when Capital Q closed.

He wrote weekly Showgirls columns in Capital Q from 19 September 1997 to 3 November 2000, which promoted coming shows and behind-the-scenes gossip. Drag queens and performers regularly mentioned included Claire de Lune, Miss 3D, Christie McNicholl, Chelsea Bun, Portia Turbo, Vanessa Wagner and Mitzi Macintosh.

Technologically challenged, Leopard never learnt how to type, and on Mondays used to dictate his Thursday deadline columns in a "fragile and dramatic" state with an "incredibly sore head" after a hectic weekly socialising period which ran from Thursdays to Sundays.

His stream-of-consciousness writing style was described as "a barely-controlled gush in which sentimentality battles it out with sensationalism, both defying any inclination to scepticism".

Rival newspaper Sydney Star Observer gave Leopard its 1996 Media Matters Award for "The Queerest Columnist on Earth" for his take on "fashion, haircuts, cocktails, nightclubs, celebrities, dead icons and personal economics".

Leopard's writing covered the schedule of LGBTIQA+ annual events, such as Pride New Year's Eve parties, Mardi Gras Fair Day, the Mardi Gras parade and party, Shop Yourself Stupid, Hand in Hand Pride party, Bobby Goldsmith Foundation's (BGF) Bake-Off, Anti-Violence Project and Ward 17 South fundraisers, DIVA Awards, Sleaze Ball, the Green Park Hotel's Affair (raising money for Darlinghurst Community Health Centre and St Vincent's HIV unit) and World AIDS Day.

Some of his talked-about columns included his annual 25 Most Beautiful People roundup, Fair Day dunking, Mirror Ball collapse on Pride New Year's Eve partygoers and many after-party summaries over several pages. His self-confessed vices included stealing friends' items, alcohol, turning up late and being lazy.

On his death he was described by a former Sydney Star Observer editor as "the columnist every editor dreams of", the "love child of Oscar Wilde and Noel Coward". Leopard was remembered in a queer anthology as "smart, kind, loving and loyal" with a "refreshing disregard for social norms and expectations".

== Club night promotions ==
He was a club promoter for Sydney's Viper Room, a lounge bar at the Beresford hotel (1995–1996), The Blue Dragon at MTT (Rogues nightclub), and Love Machine at the Bright'N Up Bar, Brighton Hotel.

Leopard held occasional movie nights with Capital Q's astrologer, Stephen Devine, at the Hollywood Hotel featuring his favourite icons Lana Turner, Elizabeth Taylor, Marlene Dietrich and Joan Crawford, with DJs, quizzes, prizes and tarot readings.

He MCed many community events and fundraisers, including the Mardi Gras costume pageant, Fair Day, DIVA Awards (also a judge in 1995), and for the Bobby Goldsmith Foundation (BGF), People Living with HIV/AIDS (PLWHA), the Green Hotel's Affair, Shop Yourself Stupid, Luncheon Club, the AIDS Council of NSW's (ACON) Hand In Hand party, 2010, AIDS Trust's Red Ribbon Working Bee and ACON's Anti-Violence Project.

== Bashing in 2001 ==
Leopard had multiple surgeries after a vicious gay hate attack on Saturday 3 August 2001 when he was "ambushed and beaten senseless". He had a metal plate inserted in his jaw, which was "broken on both sides" and "wired shut for six weeks".

He needed ongoing surgeries for several months and apologised for being unable to attend and write up the Sydney Gay and Lesbian Mardi Gras events the following year in February 2002.

== Acting career: 1988 to 2014 ==
Leopard featured as an androgynous muse in the Lime Spiders' Weirdo Libido music video (1988), the first music video shown by the Australian national broadcaster, the ABC, on its music clip program, rage, on April 17, 1987.

He made an appearance in the SBS Pizza 8-part comedy series in April 2000 as a "sleazy S&M master".

Leopard also starred in seven Eterna Films short movie productions, which sponsors the annual ShortFest film festival, that began in 2024. Named in his honour, the Lance Leopard award was presented in 2024 and 2025 to short films that recognised the spirit of coming up with an idea that "dares to be different with boldness and audacity".

== Death ==
Leopard returned to Brisbane in the 2020s to care for his elderly mother, Carmel Pierce. They both had mobility problems and died in a house fire on 16 June 2024, in Woodridge, Brisbane.
