= Jim Hyde =

Australian LGBT rights and health activist and public servant

James Hyde (died August 2018), known as Jim, was an Australian LGBTQI rights and health activist, community leader, public health policy adviser, and former political adviser for the Australian Labor Party. He is the title character of the 2025 family drama film, Jimpa, made by his daughter, Adelaide filmmaker Sophie Hyde.

== Early life and education ==
James Hyde grew up in country towns around South Australia.

== Career ==
Hyde worked in the Politics Department of the University of Adelaide in 1983.

In the 1980s, Hyde was a political adviser for the Australian Labor Party (ALP) as well as serving on its LGBTI policy committee.

He worked as a researcher, policymaker, and librarian in the Parliament of South Australia.

He stood for the Australian Senate as an ALP candidate in the 1990 Australian federal election. He worked with and for Peter Duncan for the 13 years he served in the Australian Parliament, undertaking a variety of roles.

Hyde was a leader in HIV and AIDS policy and legislation in both South Australia and Victoria. In 1990, at the height of the AIDS epidemic in Australia, he moved to Victoria and became general manager of the Victorian AIDS Council (later renamed Thorne Harbour Health), a role he kept until 1994. In this role, he liaised with Health Minister Marie Tehan and the (Liberal Party) Kennett government, always stressing the need for evidence-based health policy. Hyde was at the helm when the AIDS Council moved to South Yarra and at the time of the opening of the Positive Living Centre in St Kilda in 1993, and was involved with the organisation for nearly 30 years.

Hyde also served as a campaign manager for Frances Bedford in South Australia in 1997. He became a senior public servant in both New South Wales and Victoria, including as Victoria's director of public health (2011).

== Activism ==
Hyde advocated for LGBTQI rights, speaking out when homosexuality was still criminalised in Australia. He also advocated for remote and rural students, Aboriginal and Torres Strait Islander students, and socially disadvantaged young people.

He was a founding member of the AIDS Council of South Australia and the South Australian Gay and Lesbian Rights Lobby.

== Academia and other roles ==
Hyde was a member of the University of Adelaide Council and the board of the Centre for Aboriginal Studies in Music, and a founding member of the Graham F Smith Peace Trust.

He was an adjunct chair at the University of Western Sydney, an honorary senior lecturer at the Monash Centre for Ethics in Medicine and Society, and a professor of public health policy at Deakin University from sometime before at least 2013 He is referred to as a professor in many sources, from at least 2004.

He was president of NSW Branch of Public Health Australia in 2004. In 2005, he was director of policy and communications at Royal Australasian College of Physicians.

He was a life member of Thorne Harbour Health, and described as "an active and vigorous board member" up until the time of his death.

== Recognition and honours ==
In 1993 Hyde received the inaugural Rainbow Award for Leadership in the Gay Community.

In 2008, he was awarded PLWHA Victoria President's award for Services to the Positive Community in 2008.

In 2016 Hyde was made a fellow of the Victorian chapter of the Institute of Public Administration Australia.

He was also a Fellow of the Australian College of Health Service Executives (FACHSE).

== Personal life and death ==
Hyde was married to Patricia before coming out as gay, and they had two daughters, Alice and filmmaker Sophie Hyde. After his death, Sophie made a film called Jimpa based on their family's unusual life, as a tribute to him. He is played by John Lithgow in the film, while Sophie is played by Olivia Colman. Hyde's grandchild, Aud Mason-Hyde, who is nonbinary in real life, plays the character based on themselves.

His life partner in later life was Glenn. Hyde died in August 2018, after suffering a series of strokes, and was honoured with tributes both in the federal and South Australian Parliaments, by Julian Hill and Frances Bedford respectively.
