= Mitchell Tyrie =

Australian manufacturer of teddy bears and plush toys

Mitchell Tyrie was an Australian manufacturer of teddy bears in the 1990s. Founded by Pol McCann, the company created bears sold at auction for charity, with contributions from Australian and international designers. Proceeds from these auctions were donated to HIV/AIDS-related charities, with the company raising over $200,000 for this cause by 1996.

== Bears ==
Bears manufactured by Mitchell Tyrie were designed as mohair teddy bears. Special versions of the bears as collectors items, designed as "character bears", were dressed as figures such as Queen Elizabeth, Audrey Hepburn or Dame Edna Everidge. The bears were named alphabetically and identified by label on their left foot. Their garments included contributions from Australian and international fashion and theatrical designers, including David Hockney, Vivienne Westwood, Emmanuel Ungaro, and Karl Lagerfeld.

== History ==
The company was founded in Melbourne in 1991 by Pol McCann, a former children's librarian, who taught himself how to create teddy bears as Christmas presents. Production grew from manufacturing 120 bears in 1991 to 1,200 bears in 1995.

The bears were sold at auction by Christie's between 1993 and 1995, including 4 August 1992, 16 August 1993, and 6 November 1994. Proceeds from the sales were distributed to charities including the Victorian AIDS Council and Bobby Goldsmith Foundation. The 1993 auction raised over $95,000 for charity, with a bear of Dame Edna Everidge sold for $6,000, then a record price for an Australian produced teddy bear. Mitchell Tyrie raised over $200,000 for charity, and sold an estimated 400 bears at these events.

== Legacy ==
In 2023, four Mitchell Tyrie bears were exhibited at the Melbourne Museum as part of Rainbow Threads, a showcase of the contributions of the LGBTQIA+ creative community to Melbourne's art and culture. The museum described the bears as representative of the high-profile fundraising methods adopted by the creative industries during the AIDS crisis.
