= Ladies Please =

1995 Australian documentary

- DVD release
- Directed by: Andrew Saw
- Written by: Andrew Saw
- Produced by: Rebel Penfold-Russell; Phaedon Vass; Vicki Watson
- Starring: Cindy Pastel (Ritchie Finger); Strykermyer (Mark Fitzhugh); Lady Bump (Stuart Garske)
- Edited by: Danny Cooper
- Release date: 1995
- Country: Australia
- Language: English

Ladies Please is a 1995 Australian documentary film directed by Andrew Saw about three Sydney-based drag queens who inspired The Adventures of Priscilla, Queen of the Desert.

The lives of Cindy Pastel (Ritchie Finger), Strykermyer (Mark Fitzhugh) and Lady Bump (Stuart Garske) are profiled in detail and contrasted with their depictions in Priscilla. This culminates in Pastel and Bump travelling to the Cannes Film Festival for the film's premiere and meeting Terence Stamp and Hugo Weaving. The documentary presents the encounter as brief and marked by social distance between the drag performers and the film's actors.

Saw set out to "(make the film) in such a way that if you got three drag queens who could write and direct, this is the film they would make". He had the trio give natural answers to a series of questions, then transcribed their answers and had them read them aloud to camera twice, in and out of drag. The film then cuts between both sets of footage interchangeably to show both sides of their lives. Strykermyer called the film "a peace offering from drag queens (that) goes to show I am not an absolute freak". The film ends with Strykermyer reflecting on the future:

The future? I'd like to keep changing and evolving drag. It can be anything I want it to be. But you know what? It'd be nice to be paid properly.

The Age wrote that the film "shows the vulnerability of the drag queen's life in more humanising detail (than Priscilla)". Mary Colbert also wrote in The Sydney Morning Herald that the film "shows drag at its most innovative with performers taking acts far beyond the 'tits and feathers' world of Shirley Bassey-inspired female impersonations to shows that are satirical, political and socially pointed."

Ladies Please first aired on the ABC on 22 May 1995. That year, it was nominated for Best TV Documentary at the AFI Awards. In 2004, it was included as a bonus feature on the DVD reissue of Priscilla. It was later released by Rebel Studios as a standalone DVD in 2008, and then on video on demand in 2014.
