= AIDS photo diary, 1986–1990 =

AIDS photo diary, 1986–1990 is an art work that comprises a photo diary that records the decline in health and eventual death of David Tosh, from AIDS from 1986 to 1990 in Sydney, Australia. The diary – with accompanying photographs taken by John Jenner – was created by Jenner to remember his friend and honour the lives of people living with HIV/AIDS. Some of the images were featured in an article in Sydney Morning Herald's Good Weekend magazine, 13 October 1990, pp. 20–29.

== Contents ==
The work includes photographs by John Jenner from 1986 to 1990, together with a biography in the form of a play written by Jenner. The diary also includes poems by Willy Barber.

== Context ==
This diary was one of a number of artistic responses to HIV/AIDS in Australia at a time when medications that could prolong and enhance the quality of life of those living with HIV had not been developed. David Tosh died on 3 May 1990 aged 30 years. In 1990 Australia experienced 2381 cases of AIDS as reported by the National Centre in HIV Epidemiology and Clinical Research. 97% of these cases were male and the survival rate was only 40%.

Australia’s experience of HIV/AIDS in the 1980s and 90s is thus ancient history, and so much of that time is gone: a time of the dead and the dying; vigil shifts at ward 17; watching brilliant and beautiful men sliding into garbled dementia; polite efforts to avoid funeral scheduling conflicts; two full pages of obits in the Sydney Star Observer; anger and love and screaming horror at the waste of so many lives.

— Stephen Dunne, Sydney Morning Herald, 13 November 2006

The diary was exhibited in the 100 Objects Exhibition at the State Library of New South Wales in 2010.
