= Simon Dunn =

Australian bobsledder (1987–2023)

Personal information
- Nationality: Australian
- Born: 27 July 1987; Goulburn, New South Wales, Australia
- Died: 21 January 2023 (aged 35); Surry Hills, New South Wales, Australia
- Height: 1.84 m (6 ft 0 in)
- Weight: 99 kg (218 lb)

Sport
- Country: Australia
- Sport: Bobsleigh Rugby
- Team: Australian Bobsleigh Team; Sydney Convicts Rugby Club; Calgary Canucks; Kings Cross Steelers London
- Updated on 16 March 2016

Simon Dunn (27 July 1987 – 21 January 2023) was an Australian bobsledder and rugby player. Raised in Wollongong, in 2014, he was the first openly gay male to represent any country in the sport of bobsled. After several years in London, he lived in Sydney and played rugby before his death.

== Career ==
Simon Dunn grew up playing rugby league south of Sydney, in Wollongong. Struggling with his own sexuality and life in sport, he initially quit when he first came out but resumed playing after returning to Sydney from Canada when he became a player for the Sydney Convicts Rugby club. Travelling to Canada to further his playing career while he worked at WinSport's Performance Training Centre, Dunn had the opportunity to try out for the Australian bobsleigh team. In making this team and representing his country, this made him the first out gay man to represent any country in the sport. He was the brakeman for Lucas Mata. In November 2016, he announced his retirement from bobsleigh. He then played rugby in London, UK, with the Kings Cross Steelers. Dunn was also nominated and shortlisted for the Australian LGBTI Awards Sports Personality of the Year in both 2018 and 2019. Dunn contributed as a columnist to Attitude, Gay Times and DNA magazines' online editions and had more recently been a columnist on GuysLikeU and Gays with Kids.

In 2020, Dunn made his acting debut as the lead actor in Greg Gould and Inaya Day's music video for the single "Love Like This". The video was part of Global Pride 2020.

In July 2021, Dunn announced his return to bobsleigh and intention to represent Australia at the 2022 Winter Olympics in Beijing. He began training with the Australian team in September 2021 by competing in both two-man and four-man events in Whistler, but he suffered a ruptured biceps during his second four-man race of the season in Whistler, British Columbia, which required his return to Australia for treatment. In an interview, he stated that the injury and rehabilitation time "make [his] chances very slim" to compete in the 2022 Olympics.

== Advocacy work ==
After his initial retirement from the Australian Bobsleigh team, Dunn began to focus on social causes that were important to him, notably those affecting the LGBTQI community, homophobia in sport, and HIV/AIDS. Whilst in London, Dunn appeared on Sky News to debate comments made by professional rugby player Israel Folau, and he was the face of a national HIV test campaign with the charity the Terrence Higgins Trust, along with testing himself for HIV live online.

Following his return to Sydney, Dunn continued with this work, being announced as an ambassador for GiveOUT Day, which aims to help LGBTIQ+ projects and community groups. In 2020, Dunn also became an ambassador for the Bobby Goldsmith Foundation, which is Australia's longest-running HIV charity.

== Media appearances ==
Dunn attracted a strong social media following and, in July 2015, created a YouTube channel. Being noticed and featured on BuzzFeed, Dunn appeared in Attitude magazine's Naked Issue. With his popularity among readers he was also later voted in number 1 of the magazine's annual Hot 100 list. Since the start of 2016, Dunn had appeared in hundreds of media publications, including print, online, radio, and television. Dunn also graced the cover of several print media magazines around the world.

In 2020, he appeared in the documentary film Steelers: The World's First Gay Rugby Club by Eammon Ashton-Atkinson, alongside Steve Brockman and Nic Evans.

== Death ==
Dunn was found dead inside his Surry Hills apartment on 21 January 2023, with police not treating his death as suspicious. He was 35.
