= Bobby Goldsmith =

Australian swimmer (1946–1984)

Personal information
- Born: 8 March 1946 Sydney, Australia
- Died: 18 June 1984 (aged 38) Surry Hills, Australia

Sport
- Sport: Swimming

Robert Bernard Goldsmith, known as Bobby Goldsmith, (8 March 1946 – 18 June 1984) was one of Australia's early victims of acquired immune deficiency syndrome (AIDS). Goldsmith was an Australian athlete and active gay community member who won 17 medals in swimming at the first Gay Olympics, in San Francisco in 1982.

== Biography ==
Goldsmith was born in Hurstville, a suburb of Sydney, although soon after his family moved more regionally within New South Wales and, from the age of six he was a boarder at the St John's Hostel in Forbes while attending local public schools. Later, after finishing high school, he attended Sydney Teachers' College between 1964 and 1965 with a scholarship.

After qualifying as a teacher Goldsmith was posted at the public school in Captains Flat but soon found this was not a good fit for him and he repaid his scholarship and took a position working for the National Library of Australia in Canberra while studying part-time at the Australian National University. Two years later he returned to Sydney where he worked to the Commonwealth Repatriation Department.

Goldsmith was an active person and he enjoyed social activities, including nightclubbing and dancing more generally, and was known as a charismatic and generous figure in Sydney's social scene. He was also very involved in LGBTQ activism and participated in the first Sydney Gay and Lesbian Mardi Gras making him a 78er.

Goldsmith was also a keen recreational swimmer and surfer. Goldsmith represented Australia at the first Gay Olympics, in San Francisco in 1982 where he won 17 of the teams 21 medals. These included 4 gold, 11 silver and 2 bronze.

Goldsmith also often made trips overseas and it is likely that is where he acquired AIDS and, by 1983, he was terminally ill. He was diagnosed in the early days of the epidemic and there were very few treatment options available, however, in his illness he was assisted by a network of friends who organised care for him, allowing him to live independently alongside his partner Ken.

Over the course of his medical care Ken refused to wear the then standard gloves, gowns and masks and in doing so they became forerunners in showing that this sort of contact had no danger and improved the treatment of other AIDS patients. Additionally, while the couple felt appropriately supported by some of the doctors and other staff, Ken's complaints and arguments with others led to improvements in sanitation, visiting rights and meal delivery services.

From this network emerged the Bobby Goldsmith Foundation, which is Australia's oldest HIV/AIDS charity. Their first event, a benefit function, was held on 13 May 1984 at the Midnight Shift, an LGBTQ nightclub on Oxford Street, and it raised over $6000. Some of the money raised was used to personally support Goldsmith in the purchase of equipment to allow him to live at home, and also for a video player to enable him to watch opera which he loved, however, after his death it was placed in trust to help other AIDS patients.

Goldsmith died on 18 June 1984 at his home in Surry Hills and it was the first death publicly acknowledged as being HIV-AIDS related in New South Wales.

== See also ==
- HIV/AIDS in Australia
