= Lasseters =

Entertainment complex in Alice Springs, Australia

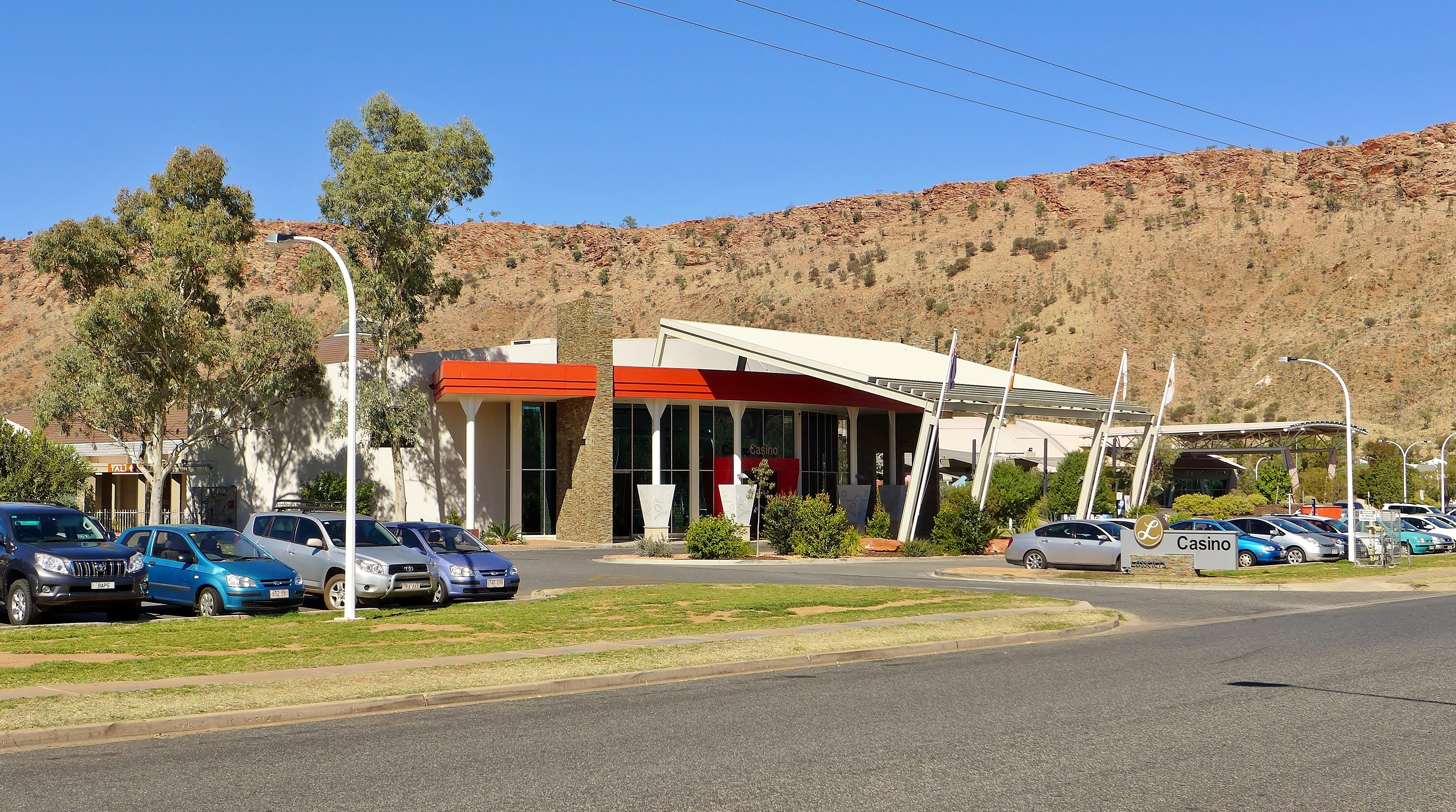
- Lasseters Casino, 2015
- Interactive map of Lasseters
- Location: 93 Barrett Drive; Alice Springs NT; Australia; 23°43′13″S 133°52′36″E
- Opened: 1981
- No. of rooms: 205
- Owner: Lasseters International Holdings Pty. Ltd.
- Previous names: Diamond Springs Casino
- Website: http://www.lhc.com.au and Website

Lasseters is an entertainment complex located in Alice Springs, Northern Territory, Australia. It incorporates a hotel, a casino, and the Alice Springs Convention Centre.

The resort is featured in the movie The Adventures of Priscilla, Queen of the Desert.

== Hotel ==
Crowne Plaza Alice Springs Lasseters, formerly Lasseters Hotel, offers 205 guest rooms in addition to a variety of facilities and amenities including a resort pool, spa and sauna, fitness centre, casual dining in Tali a la carte restaurant and access to a variety of food and beverage options within the Lasseters casino. In 2016, InterContinental Hotels Group (IHG) and Ford Dynasty Pty Ltd signed a franchise agreement to refurbish and rebrand Lasseters Hotel into Crowne Plaza Alice Springs Lasseters.

== Casino ==
Lasseters Casino is the only casino in Alice Springs, holding an exclusive casino licence for NT's Southern Division until 2018.

== Convention centre ==
The complex is home to the Alice Springs Convention Centre.
