= HIV/AIDS in Australia =

The history of HIV/AIDS in Australia is distinctive, as Australian government bodies recognised and responded to the AIDS pandemic relatively swiftly, with the implementation of effective disease prevention and public health programs, such as needle and syringe programs (NSPs). As a result, despite significant numbers of at-risk group members contracting the virus in the early period following its discovery, Australia achieved and has maintained a low rate of HIV infection in comparison to the rest of the world.

AIDS is no longer considered an epidemic or a public health issue in Australia, due to the success of anti-retroviral drugs and extremely low HIV-to-AIDS progression rates.

== History ==
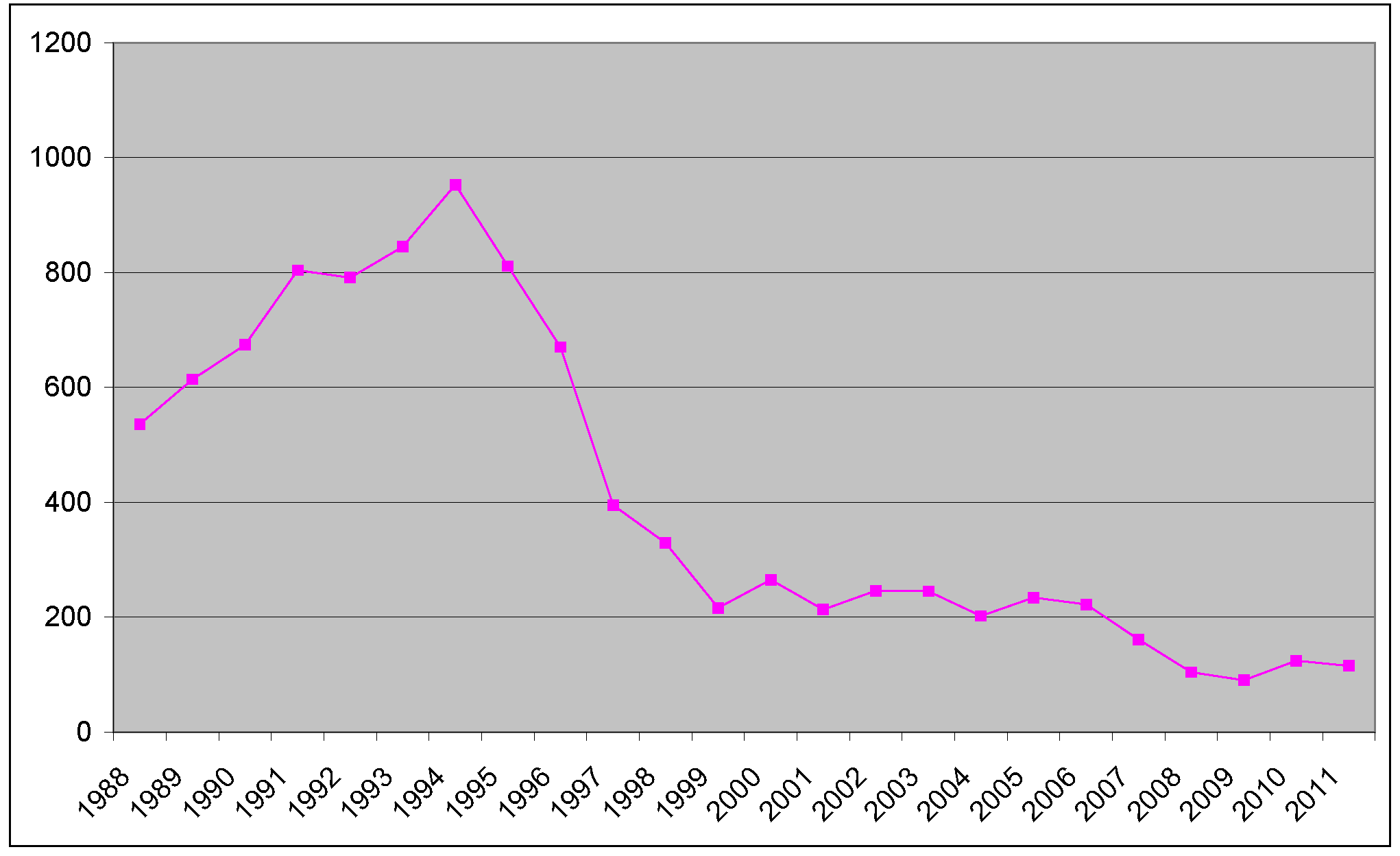
Estimated AIDS diagnoses by year in Australia from data at avert.org

=== 1980s–1990s ===
The first Australian case occurred in 1981: the patient was a 72-year-old man who died in September that year. However, the case was only diagnosed retrospectively in 1994. Until then, the first reported case was a 27-year-old New York resident on a working holiday, who was diagnosed in Sydney in October 1982.

In May 1983, Sixty Minutes, a then highly-popular television current affairs programme that was broadcast on a national free network, Channel 9, featured a 15 minute report The AIDS Mystery. As the first significant media account in the country, the programme's large audience reach caused it to have wide impact. The first reported death in Australia from HIV/AIDS was reported in Melbourne in July 1983.

Spurred to action both by the emergence of the disease amongst their social networks and by public hysteria and vilification, gay and lesbian, people who use drugs illicitly, and sex worker communities and organisations were instrumental in the respective rapid creation of AIDS councils, Drug User Organisations (DUOs), sex worker organisations, and positive people's groups. The AIDS councils were formed in South Australia, Victoria, and Western Australia in 1983, and in New South Wales, Queensland, Tasmania, and the Australian Capital Territory in 1985. The Victorian Aids Council (VAC) was headed by South Australian activist and community leader Jim Hyde from 1990 until 1994, who had been a co-founder of the AIDS Council of South Australia, and remained an active board member of VAC until his death in 2018. The peer-based DUOs were first founded between 1985 and 1992 to prevent the transmission of HIV among people who injected drugs illicitly.

The state and territory AIDS councils, along with the national peak organisations representing at-risk groups: the Australian Injecting & Illicit Drug Users League (AIVL) - formerly the Australian IV League, the National Association of People with HIV Australia (NAPWHA), Anwernekenhe National Aboriginal and Torres Strait Islander HIV/AIDS Alliance (ANA), the Scarlet Alliance, and the Australian Federation of AIDS Organisations (AFAO), all contribute actively to Australia's response to HIV.

Non-governmental organisations formed swiftly and have remained prominent in addressing AIDS in Australia. The most notable include the AIDS Trust of Australia, formed in 1987, The Victorian AIDS Council (VAC), now known as Thorne Harbour Health, formed in July 1983, and the Bobby Goldsmith Foundation, founded in mid 1984. The Bobby Goldsmith Foundation is one of Australia's oldest HIV/AIDS charities. The Foundation is named in honour of Bobby Goldsmith, one of Australia's early victims of the disease, who was an athlete and active gay community member, who won 17 medals in swimming at the first Gay Olympics, in San Francisco in 1982. The Foundation had its origins in a network of friends who organised care for Goldsmith to allow him to live independently during his illness, until his death in June 1984. This approach to supporting care and independent living in the community is the basis of the Foundation's work, but is also an approach reflected in the activities and priorities of many HIV/AIDS organisations in Australia.

In 1985, Eve van Grafhorst was ostracised since she had contracted HIV/AIDS caused by a transfusion of infected blood. The family moved to New Zealand, where she died at the age of 11.

A 1993 article by Brisbane newspaper columnist Lawrie Kavanagh, in which he alleged a HIV education and support program for gay youth was government-sponsored recruitment for "a sewer practice," provoked a crowd 'Die-In' protest outside the offices of The Courier Mail.

=== 2000–present ===
While the spread of the disease has been limited with some success, the AIVL Network of DUOs and partner NSPs successfully achieved low prevalence among people who use drugs and the Scarlet Alliance did the same among sex workers, HIV/AIDS continues to present challenges in Australia. The Bobby Goldsmith Foundation reports that nearly a third of people with HIV/AIDS in New South Wales (the state with the largest infected population) are living below the poverty line. Living with HIV/AIDS is associated with significant changes in employment and accommodation circumstances. The Centre of Social Research in Health also reported rising stigma and discrimination against people who inject drugs illicitly reducing access to testing, treatment and care.

Survival time for people with HIV has improved over time, in part through the introduction of antiretroviral drug treatments with post-exposure prophylaxis treatments reducing the possibility of seroconversion and minimising the likelihood of HIV progression to AIDS. However, HIV does have its own health issues.

After the initial success in limiting the spread of HIV, infection rates began to rise again in Australia, though they remained low by global standards. After dropping to 656 new reported cases in 2000, the rate rose to 930 in 2005. Transmission continued to be predominantly through sexual contact between men, in contrast to many high-prevalence countries in which it was increasingly spread through heterosexual sex. Indeed, the majority of new Australian cases of HIV/AIDS resulting from heterosexual contact have arisen through contact with a partner from a high-prevalence country (particularly from sub-Saharan Africa or parts of south-east Asia).

The new trend toward an increase in HIV infections prompted the government to indicate it was considering a return to highly visible advertising. Reflecting this concern with the rise in new cases, Australia's fifth National HIV/AIDS Strategy (for the period 2005–2008) was titled Revitalising Australia's Response, and placed an emphasis on education and the prevention of transmission.

On 19 October 2010, The Sydney Morning Herald reported that 21,171 Australians were living with HIV, with 1,050 new cases diagnosed in 2009. The Sydney Morning Herald also reported that 63% of Australians living with HIV were men who have sex with men, and 3% were people who inject drugs.

In 2016, the Australian government and AFAO announced that AIDS was no longer a public health crisis, given the decline in numbers of new cases and the availability of treatment.

== Australian responses to HIV/AIDS ==
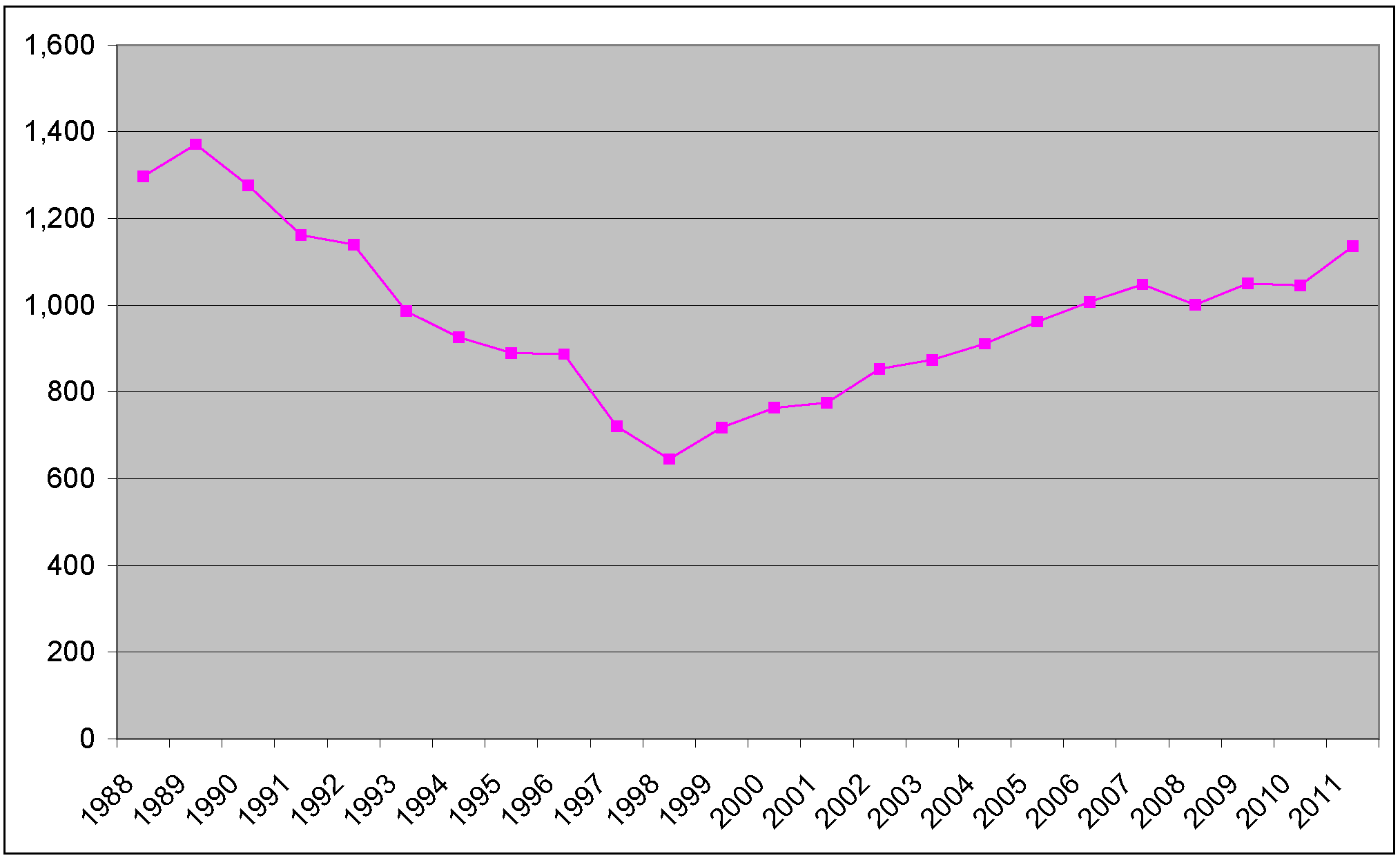
Estimated HIV diagnoses by year from avert.org

The Australian health policy response to HIV/AIDS has been characterised as emerging from the grassroots rather than top-down, and as involving a high degree of partnership between government and non-government stakeholders. The capacity of these groups to respond early and effectively was instrumental in lowering infection rates before government-funded prevention programs were operational. The response of both governments and NGOs was also based on recognition that social action would be central to controlling the disease epidemic.

Grim reaper advertisement

In 1987, a well-known advertising program was launched, including television advertisements that featured the grim reaper rolling a ten-pin bowling ball toward a group of people standing in the place of the pins. These advertisements garnered a lot of attention: controversial when released, and continuing to be regarded as effective as well as pioneering television advertising.

The willingness of the Australian government to use mainstream media to deliver a blunt message through advertising was credited as contributing to Australia's success in managing HIV. However the campaign also contributed to stigma for those living with the disease, particularly in the gay community, an impact one of the advertising scheme's architects later regretted.

Australian Governments began in the mid-1980s to pilot or support programs involving needle exchange for intravenous drug users. These remain occasionally controversial, but are reported to have been crucial in keeping the incidence of the disease low, as well as being extremely cost-effective.

HIV/AIDS quickly became a more severe problem for several countries in the region around Australia, notably Papua New Guinea and Thailand, than it was within Australia itself. This led Australian governments and non-government organisations to place an increasing emphasis on international initiatives, particularly aimed at limiting the spread of the disease. In 2000, the Australian government introduced a $200 million HIV/AIDS prevention program that was targeted at south-east Asia. In 2004, this was increased to $600 million over the six years to 2010 for the government's international HIV/AIDS response program, called Meeting the Challenge. Australian non-government organisations such as the AIDS Trust are also involved in international efforts to combat the illness.

== HIV/AIDS and Australian law ==
=== Deliberate or reckless transmission ===
In response to the risks of HIV transmission, some governments (e.g. Denmark) passed legislation designed specifically to criminalise intentional transmission of HIV. Australia has not enacted specific laws, there have been a small number of prosecutions under existing state laws, with four convictions recorded between 2004 and 2006.

The case of Andre Chad Parenzee, convicted in 2006 and unsuccessfully appealed in 2007, secured widespread media attention as a result of expert testimony given by a Western Australian medical physicist that HIV did not lead to AIDS.

In February 2008, Hector Smith, aged 41, a male prostitute in the Australian Capital Territory who is HIV-positive, pleaded guilty in the ACT Magistrates Court to providing a commercial sexual service while knowing he was infected with a sexually-transmitted disease (STD) and failing to register as a sex worker. Under ACT law it is illegal to provide or receive commercial sexual services if the person knows, or could reasonably be expected to know, that he or she is infected with a sexually transmitted infection (STI).

In January 2009 Melbourne man Michael Neal was jailed for 18 years (with a minimum term of thirteen years, nine months) for deliberately infecting and trying to infect sexual partners with HIV without their knowledge, despite multiple warnings from the Victorian Department of Human Services.

=== Discrimination ===
Australian governments have made it illegal to discriminate against a person on the grounds of their health status, including having HIV/AIDS; for example, see Disability Discrimination Act, 1992 (Cwlth). However HIV positive individuals may still be denied immigration visas on the grounds that their treatment takes up limited resources and is a burden for taxpayers. To end HIV discrimination in Queensland and Australia in general, there is a plan to raise awareness and educate local people on HIV by 2020. This program is supported by government, as well as by many educational and volunteer organizations. The main aim of the program is to educate people about HIV as it will help to prevent it and stop HIV discrimination in the area.

=== Blood donations ===
Australia was one of the first countries to screen all blood donors for HIV antibodies, with screening in place for all transfused blood since March 1985. This was not before infection was spread through contaminated blood, resulting in legal cases in the 1980s around whether screening had been appropriately implemented. One issue highlighted in the course of those actions was the challenge of medical litigation under statutes of limitation. A medical condition such as HIV that can lie latent or undiagnosed for a long period of time may only emerge after the time period for litigation has elapsed, preventing examination of medical liability. Concerns about the integrity of the blood supply resurfaced following a case of the contraction of HIV by transfusion in Victoria in 1999. This led to the introduction of new blood screening tests, which also improved screening in relation to hepatitis C.

Gay men have sought to donate blood to help increase Australia's blood supply stock, saying this volunteering would, in turn, help reduce discrimination towards LGBT people. The Australian Red Cross Blood Service have indicated their concern regarding the possible transmission of HIV and noting they are receptive to a reduction in the deferral period. Since 31 January 2021, the deferral period within Australia was reduced from 1 year to 3 months for individuals not on PrEP. Those on PrEP are still required to defer for 12 months, including MSMs and females who have sex with MSMs.

== HIV/AIDS and Pregnant Australian Women ==
By the end of 2021, there were estimated to be 3,360 women living with HIV, or 12% of all people living with HIV. In 2013, the median age of diagnosis for women was 30 years of age. The reasons for acquiring the HIV blood test is spread across three circumstances. Firstly, 30.2% of people become physically ill, 17.1% of peoples partner had tested positive therefore they accessed medical assistance and thirdly, 12.9% of people acquired testing due to exposure to a large risk episode.

=== Contracting HIV/AIDS ===
The most common form of transmissions of HIV is through blood, semen, pre-ejaculation, rectal mucus, vaginal fluids and breast milk. Therefore, women need to be extremely cautious when engaging in sexual activity as well as if and when falling pregnant. Often, behaviours that lead to women contracting the HIV virus include engagement in sexual intercourse within a heterosexual relation with someone who already has HIV/AIDS, using drugs intravenously or receiving infected blood products.

=== Pregnant while HIV-positive ===
Stages of pregnancy term
stage	starts	ends
Preterm	-	at 37 weeks
Early term	36 weeks	39 weeks
Full term	39 weeks	41 weeks
Late term	41 weeks	42 weeks
Postterm	42 weeks	-

Risks of passing on the HIV virus to an unborn child is extremely high for women whom have been diagnosed with HIV/AIDS. In Australia, it is a part of routine antenatal testing that mothers undergo a blood test to check for HIV/AIDS. HIV transmission to an unborn child is often called perinatal HIV transmission, Mother-To-Child-Transmission, or vertical transmission. There are three main ways a mother can risk passing on the HIV virus to her child and that is during the pregnancy via crossing of the placenta, during birth if the baby comes in contact with the mothers bodily fluids and through the practice of breastfeeding. Therefore, when falling pregnant it is important for a mother to access additional Antenatal care. Visitation to an infectious disease physician, experienced obstetrician, paediatrician and midwife is recommended. As well as accessing additional psycho-social support such as a counselor and support worker.

To reduce the risks of vertical transmission, the mother can start preparing prenatally with a series of anti-retroviral medications. Using other means of conception practices such as the method of 'sperm washing'. This is where the sperm cells are separated from the seminal fluid and used to fertilise a woman's eggs via the use of a catheter or in vitro fertilisation (IVF) methods. Seeking additional medical checkups to observe clinical markers determining disease progression along with regular observations of baby's development can also help in monitoring the health of the baby.

In addition, the postnatal care taken to reduce risks of vertical transmission include avoiding procedures where the baby's skin may be cut or electing to have a cesarean section to reduce the risk of contact with body fluids. Ensuring the baby's eyes and head are cleaned, the umbilical cord is clamped as soon as possible and placing an absorption pack (towel or sponge) over the umbilical cord when cut to prevent blood spurting will also reduce the risk of the baby coming in contact with any contaminated fluids. Bottle feeding the baby also removes any chance of coming in contact with infected body fluids. Along with the mother taking anti-retroviral medication, giving the baby a course of this until it is 4–6 weeks of age also drastically reduces its risk of transmission. Medical practitioners also require the infant undergo regular blood tests at 1 week, 6 weeks, 12 weeks, 6 months, 12 months and 18 months to test for any evidence of the HIV virus.

=== Stigma associated towards Women with HIV/AIDS ===
Association with HIV/AIDS within Australia is largely absent from the mainstream population. Therefore, in 2009, 73.6% of women diagnosed with HIV/AIDS reported unwanted disclosure of their health status due to a lack of awareness and knowledge about the disease. This was due to the large amount of stigma associated with a HIV diagnosis. The emotional and psychological problems for pregnant mothers within Australia are extremely high. 42% of women diagnosed with HIV/AIDS are also diagnosed with a mental health condition due to the harsh effects of the arising stigma around such circumstances. The stigma associated with HIV diagnosis in women often involves evoked assumptions that these women are considered a part of the sex trade industry, are homosexual or are intravenous drug users.

These women are often viewed as contagious and are assumed to have devious traits and behaviours. In western society, socially specific roles expected of women, such as motherhood, create automatic discrimination when diagnosed with HIV/AIDS. Those women diagnosed with HIV/AIDS who express the idea of wanting to become pregnant are often discriminated against as being selfish, inconsiderate, uncaring and immoral. Healthcare professionals and practitioners are often reported as having negative attitudes towards women who openly identify with having HIV/AIDS and being pregnant or wanting to become pregnant.

== Ongoing research and awareness-raising ==
The Sydney Mardi Gras, one of the largest street parades and gay and lesbian events in the world, has HIV/AIDS as a significant theme, and is one of a number of pathways through which the non-government sector in Australia continues to address the disease.

Australian researchers have been active in HIV/AIDS research since the early 1980s. The most prominent research organisation is the Kirby Institute (formerly National Centre in HIV Epidemiology & Clinical Research), based at the University of New South Wales, regarded as a leading research institution internationally, and a recipient of one of the first grants of the Bill & Melinda Gates Foundation outside the United States. The Centre focusses on epidemiology, clinical research and clinical trials. It also prepares the annual national surveillance reports on the disease. In 2006 the Centre received just under A$4 million in Commonwealth government funding, as well as several million dollars of funding from both public and pharmaceutical industry sources.

Three other research centres are also directly Commonwealth funded to investigate different facets of HIV/AIDS: the National Centre in HIV Social Research (NCHSR); the Australian Centre for HIV and Hepatitis Virology Research (ACH^{2}) (formerly the National Centre for HIV Virology Research); and the Australian Research Centre in Sex, Health and Society (ARCSHS).

Research has identified anal mucus as a significant carrier of the HIV virus, with the risk of HIV infection after one act of unprotected receptive anal sex being approximately 20 times greater than after one act of unprotected vaginal sex. Anal sex, risk-reduction strategies have been identified and promoted to reduce the likelihood of transmission of HIV/AIDS.

== Prevalence ==
At the end of 2021, 29,460 people were estimated to be living with HIV in Australia. Of these, 21,530 infections were attributable to male‐to‐male sex, 7,120 to heterosexual sex, 640 to injecting drug use, and 170 to 'other' exposures (vertical transmission to newborn, blood/tissue recipient, healthcare setting, haemophilia/coagulation disorder).

The Australian Federation of Aids Organisations reports that there has been a consistent decline in new HIV infections among men who have sex with men (MSM). After peaking at 1,079 new diagnosed cases in 2014, the number of diagnoses has dropped to reach 552 in 2021. An estimate 6.3% of all MSM in Australia are living with HIV. The decline in new HIV diagnoses in largely attributed to the a dramatic decrease in MSM with a 49% decline between 2014 and 2021.

=== XX International AIDS Conference (2014) ===
From 20 to 25 July 2014, Melbourne, Australia hosted the XX International AIDS Conference. Speakers included Michael Kirby, Richard Branson and Bill Clinton. Clinton's focus was HIV treatment and he called for a greater levels of treatment provision worldwide; in an interview during the conference, Kirby focused on legal issues and their relationship to medication costs and vulnerable groups – Kirby concluded by calling for an international inquiry:

And what is needed, as the Global Commission on HIV and the Law pointed out, is a new inquiry at international level – inaugurated by the secretary-general of the United Nations – to investigate a reconciliation between the right to health and the right of authors to proper protection for their inventions. At the moment, all the eggs are in the basket of the authors, and it's not really a proportionate balance. And that's why the Global Commission suggested that there should be a high level of investigation.

Branson, Global Drug Commissioner at the time of the conference, stressed the importance of decriminalising illicit injecting drug use to the prevention of HIV and, speaking in global terms, stated that "we're using too much money and far too many precious resources on incarceration". The Open Society Foundation launched the "To Protect and Serve How Police, Sex Workers, and People Who Use Drugs Are Joining Forces to Improve Health and Human Rights" report at the conference.

The International AIDS Society (IAS) confirmed that six passengers on board the Malaysia Airlines Flight 17 shot down over Ukraine were killed. The six delegates were acknowledged during the conference at the AIDS 2014 Candlelight Vigil event.

== Antiretroviral treatments ==
HIV infection is now treatable for those with HIV expecting to live near-normal lifespans, providing they continue taking a regimen of antiretroviral drugs. Post-exposure prophylaxis drugs are generally available in Australia at a subsidised cost through the Pharmaceutical Benefits Scheme (PBS). 84% of (the 24,000) HIV positive gay men were on antiretroviral treatments in 2014.

Pre-exposure prophylaxis (PrEP) drugs are used as a means of reducing HIV risk for people who do not have HIV, with some advocates saying it will allow condomless safe-sex. Previously it costs $750 per month to import the drug from overseas. In Australia, PrEP drugs were available, at "about $1,200 per month", following the May 2016 approval of the Therapeutic Goods Administration.

Despite the lobbying to have these PrEP drugs subsidised under the Pharmaceutical Benefits Scheme (PBS), in August 2016 it was announced that the Pharmaceutical Benefits Advisory Committee (PBAC) had rejected the proposal for this drug to be PBS-subsidised. On 9 February 2018, PBAC announced that PrEP will be subsidised by the Australian Government through the PBS. The PBS subsidy came into effect on 1 April 2018, reducing the cost of PrEP to around $40 a month for eligible recipients.

== See also ==
- AIDS photo diary, 1986–1990
- Breastfeeding and HIV
- Health care in Australia
- HIV and men who have sex with men
- HIV and pregnancy
- HIV drug resistance
- HIV Drug Resistance Database
- HIV/AIDS research
- Men who have sex with men
- Post-exposure prophylaxis
- Subtypes of HIV

== Bibliography ==
- Altman, Dennis (2001). Global Sex. Chicago: University of Chicago Press. pp. 216. ISBN 0-226-01606-4.
- Bowtell, William (May 2005). "Australia's Response to HIV/AIDS 1982–2005" (PDF; requires download). HIV/AIDS Project. Lowy Institute for International Policy.
