= The Graham F. Smith Peace Foundation =

Australian foundation

- Formation: 1989

The Graham F. Smith Peace Foundation Incorporated, formerly The Graham F. Smith Peace Trust Fund Incorporated and also known simply as The Peace Foundation, is a not-for-profit organisation based in Adelaide, South Australia.

== History ==
The Graham F Smith Peace Trust was established in 1989 by Léonie Ebert and a group of trustees, including LGBT rights and health activist Jim Hyde, based on donations provided by family and friends on the death Graham F. Smith.

Smith had served in the Australian Army in the latter stages of the Second World War, spending time assisting the Indonesian people after the end of Dutch colonial rule ended. He later worked in Cuba, Nicaragua, the Philippines, and Vietnam, supporting independence struggles.

The organisation was renamed in 2011 to The Graham F Smith Peace Foundation, and is also known as the Peace Foundation.

== Purpose ==
The objectives of the Foundation are to promote literature, music, performing arts, visual arts, craft, design, film, video, television, radio, community arts, Aboriginal arts, and movable cultural heritage that relate to human rights, social justice, and environmental sustainability.

== Activities ==
- 2011 $10,000 Grant Winner - Knowing Home, by No Strings Attached Theatre of Disability, towards the creative development of a theatre piece about the place and meaning of ‘home’ in the lives of 16 adult, disabled Aboriginal and Torres Strait Islander performers.
- The Adelaide Fringe Festival Peace Award was created in 2011 and was open to all Fringe artists who promote human rights, social justice, and environmental sustainability through their art.
- Kaurna sculptures created by Donato Rosella as part of an Adelaide Festival Centre reconciliation project begun in 2002. The sculptures were placed prominently at the Festival Theatre entrance ready for the Festival Plaza reopening in 2022.

== Governance ==
The Foundation is governed by a board of directors and a Management Committee. Notable members have included:

- Stephanie Key, Member of State Parliament and former South Australian Government Minister
- Kym Mayes, former Member State Parliament and former Minister
- Ann Newmarch, founding trustee and artist
