= Hu-Man =

- Directed by: Jérôme Laperrousaz
- Screenplay by: Jérôme Laperrousaz; André Ruellan; Guillaume Laperrousaz; Francis Guilbert; Thierry Pelanne (English adaptation)
- Produced by: Terence Stamp (co-producer); Marie-Françoise Mascaro (co-producer); Jérôme Laperrousaz; Marceau Long; Yves Pauthe
- Cinematography: Jimmy Glasberg
- Edited by: Noun Serra
- Music by: Eric Burdon; Tim Blake; David Horowitz; Patrick Vian; Jean Guillou
- Production companies: Romantique Films; Office de Radiodiffusion Télévision Française; Institut national de l'audiovisuel Filmologies
- Distributed by: Camera One
- Release date: 30 September 1975; (Paris premiere)
- Running time: 105 minutes
- Country: France
- Languages: French; English; Arabic; Spanish

Hu-Man is a 1975 French science fiction film directed by Jérôme Laperrousaz.

== Plot ==
An actor is put in precarious situations while his fear is broadcast to a television audience. The audience's emotions determine whether he is sent to the past or future.

== Cast ==
- Terence Stamp as Terence
- Jeanne Moreau as Sylvana
- Agnès Stevenin as Viviane
- Frederik van Pallandt as Frédérik
- Franck Schwacke as Frank
- Gabriella Rysted as Gabriella
- Giannis Thomas as L'homme oiseau/Birdman
- Valerie Decaux as L'enfant
- Bob Traynor as Technicien
- Frank Holman as Unknown (uncredited)

== Accolades ==
Year	Ceremony/Festival	Award	Category	Recipient	Result
1976	1st César Awards	César Award	Best Sound	Harrik & Harald Maury	Nominated
1976	14th Trieste International Science Fiction Film Festival	Golden Asteroid	Best Film		Won
1976	14th Trieste International Science Fiction Film Festival	Silver Asteroid	Best Actor	Terence Stamp	Won
