= Bobby Goldsmith Foundation =

Australian HIV charity

- Named after: Bobby Goldsmith
- Formation: 1984
- Legal status: Charity
- Location: Level 3, 111-117 Devonshire Street, Surry Hills, NSW 2010
- Region served: New South Wales, South Australia
- President: Carla Treloar
- CEO: Nick Lawson
- Website: bgf.org.au

Bobby Goldsmith Foundation (BGF) is an Australian HIV charity based in Sydney, New South Wales. It aims to provide practical, emotional and financial assistance to people living with HIV and currently operates in New South Wales and Adelaide. It was formed in July 1984 from a trust fund organised after the death of Bobby Goldsmith, who was the first person in New South Wales to be publicly recognised as having died of AIDS-related illness. It is one of Australia's oldest HIV charities.

== History ==
The first fundraiser for what became BGF was held at the Midnight Shift, an LGBTQ nightclub on Oxford Street, on 13 May 1984 under the auspices of the Gay Counselling Service. This event alone raised over $6000 specifically for the care and treatment of Bobby Goldsmith and, some of this, was used for the purchase of equipment to allow him to live at home, and also for a video player to enable him to watch opera which he loved. However, after his death it was placed in trust to help other AIDS patients and create the Foundation.

Shortly after its formation, BGF became a founding member of the New South Wales AIDS Action Committee. In 1985, BGF assisted in funding the AIDS Council of New South Wales's 'Rubba Me' safe sex campaign after the NSW Government withdrew its support.

As of 2018, BGF offered one of two HIV self-management programs in Australia.

Former High Court Justice Michael Kirby has been BGF's patron since 2002 and journalist Ita Buttrose is a life member. In 2020, former bobsledder and rugby union player Simon Dunn was announced as an ambassador for BGF.

BGF is currently an affiliate member of the Australian Federation of AIDS Organisations, the National Association of People With HIV Australia and the Australasian Society for HIV, Viral Hepatitis and Sexual Health Medicine.

== See also ==
- HIV/AIDS in Australia
