= Terence Stamp =

English actor (1938–2025)

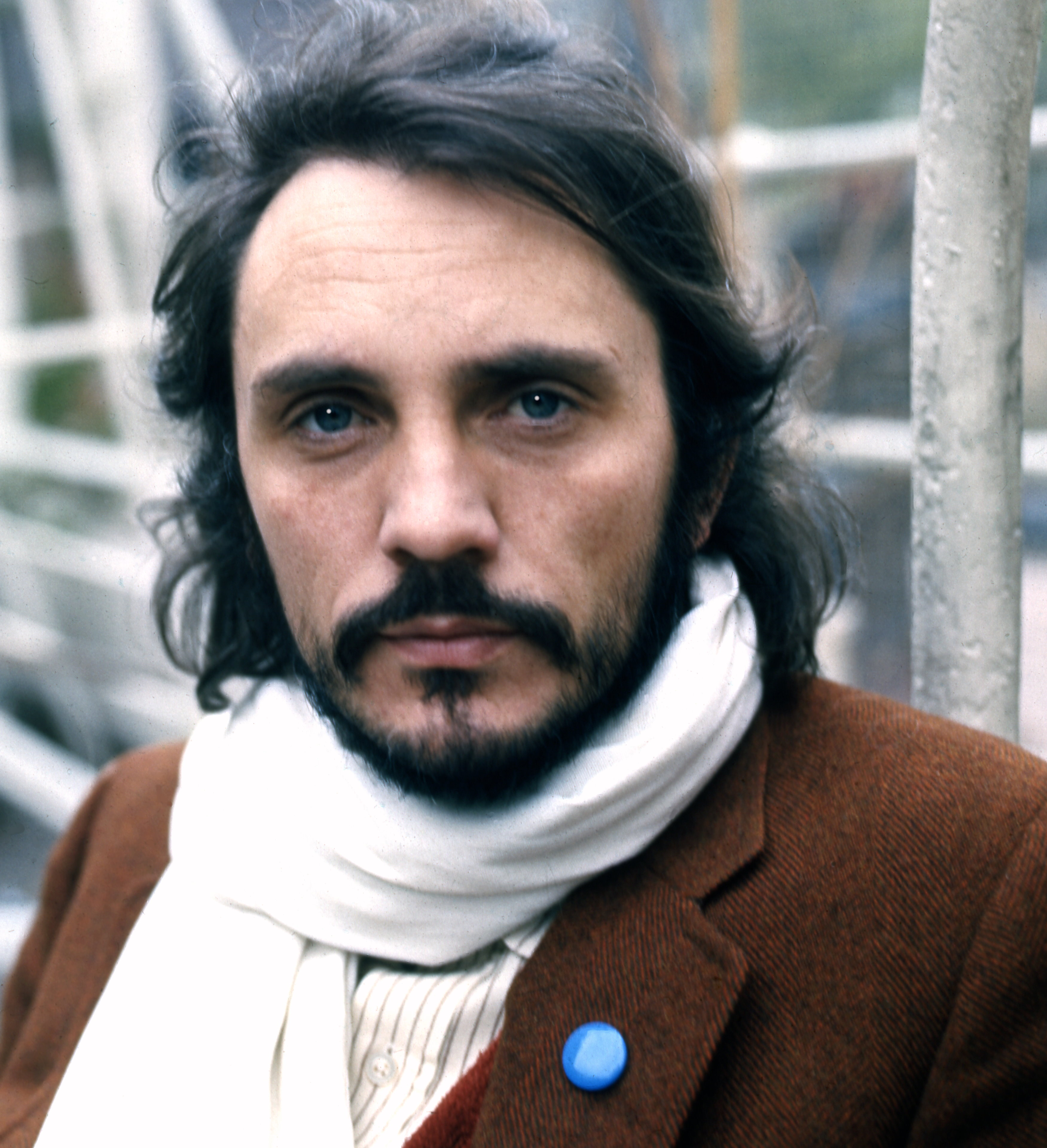
- Stamp in 1973
- Born: Terence Henry Stamp; 22 July 1938; Stepney, London, England
- Died: 17 August 2025 (aged 87); Bickley, London, England
- Education: Webber Douglas Academy of Dramatic Art
- Occupation: Actor
- Years active: 1959–2025
- Works: List of performances
- Spouse: Elizabeth O'Rourke (m. 2002; div. 2008)
- Relatives: Chris Stamp (brother)

Terence Henry Stamp (22 July 1938 – 17 August 2025) was an English actor. His filmography included a mix of cult and mainstream performances, particularly sophisticated villain roles. He received various accolades, including a Golden Globe Award, a Cannes Film Festival Award and two Satellite Awards, as well as nominations for an Academy Award, a Laurel Award, a Chlotrudis Award, an Independent Spirit Award, and two BAFTA Awards. He was named by Empire as one of the 100 Sexiest Film Stars of All Time in 1995.

Stamp trained at the Webber Douglas Academy of Dramatic Art in London, before acting in the Wolf Mankowitz production of This Year Next Year (1960) at the West End's Vaudeville Theatre. He made his American film debut playing the title role in the film Billy Budd (1962), which earned him a Golden Globe Award as well as nominations for an Academy Award and a BAFTA Award. He starred in the psychological horror film The Collector (1965) for which he won the Cannes Film Festival Award for Best Actor. He went on to appear in films such as Modesty Blaise (1966), Far from the Madding Crowd (1967), Poor Cow (1967), Teorema (1968), Spirits of the Dead (1968), and The Mind of Mr. Soames (1969).

Stamp gained wider fame for his role as archvillain General Zod in the superhero films Superman (1978) and Superman II (1980). For his leading role in the Australian road comedy The Adventures of Priscilla, Queen of the Desert (1994), he earned BAFTA Award and Golden Globe Award nominations. He then starred in The Limey (1999), earning an Independent Spirit Award nomination. He also acted in films such as Wall Street (1987), Young Guns (1988), Star Wars: Episode I – The Phantom Menace (1999), The Haunted Mansion (2003), Elektra (2005), Wanted (2008), Get Smart (2008), Yes Man (2008), Valkyrie (2008), Song for Marion (2012), and Big Eyes (2014). His final performance will be in the upcoming sequel, Priscilla Queen of the Desert 2.

== Early life ==
Terence Henry Stamp was born on 22 July 1938 in Stepney, London, England, the eldest of five children of Ethel Esther (née Perrott; 1914–1985) and Thomas Stamp (1913–1982), who was a tugboat stoker. His early years were spent in Canal Road, Bow, in the East End, but later in his childhood the family moved to 124 Chadwin Road, Plaistow, West Ham, Essex (now in Greater London), where he attended Plaistow County Grammar School. His father was away for long periods with the Merchant Navy and the young Stamp was mostly raised by his mother, grandmother, and aunts. He grew up idolising actor Gary Cooper after his mother took him to see Beau Geste (1939) when he was three years old. He was also inspired by the 1950s method-trained actor James Dean.

Growing up in London during World War II, Stamp endured the Blitz as a child. He later aided Valkyrie director Bryan Singer in staging a scene where the von Stauffenbergs hide from the Allied bombings. After leaving school Stamp worked in a variety of advertising agencies in London, working his way up to earning a reasonable salary. In the mid‑1950s he also worked as an assistant to professional golfer Reg Knight at Wanstead Golf Club in east London. He described this period of his life positively in his autobiography Stamp Album.

== Career ==
=== 1960–1977: Early career and rise to fame ===
Stamp won a scholarship to train at the Webber Douglas Academy of Dramatic Art, then performed in various provincial repertory theatres, most notably in a national tour of Willis Hall's play The Long the Short and the Tall alongside another young cockney actor, Michael Caine. Caine moved in with Stamp, and they began spending time with Peter O'Toole in the London party scene. In 1962, Stamp made his British film debut opposite Laurence Olivier in Term of Trial, but he is better remembered for his next role in Peter Ustinov's film adaptation of Herman Melville's Billy Budd (1962), which opened in America before Trial His portrayal of the title character in Budd brought him not only an Academy Award nomination but also international attention. Stamp was called the "master of the brooding silence" by The Guardian.

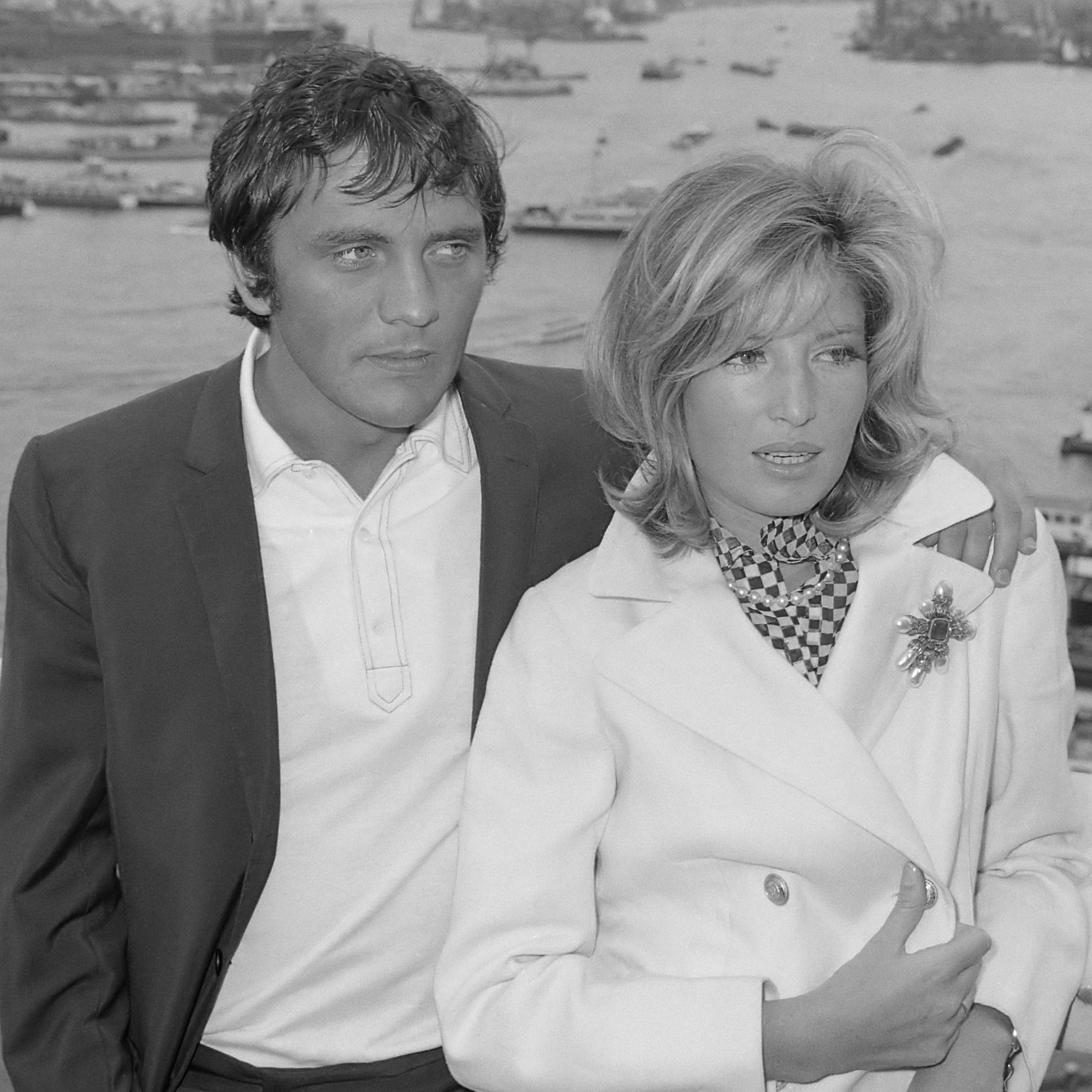
Stamp with actress Monica Vitti in 1965 during filming Modesty Blaise

In the mid-'60s, Stamp collaborated with some of the era's most revered filmmakers. He starred in The Collector (1965), William Wyler's adaptation of John Fowles's novel of the same name, opposite Samantha Eggar, and in Modesty Blaise (1966), for director Joseph Losey and producer Joe Janni. Stamp was considered for the title role of Alfie (1966) but turned it down in favour of Modesty Blaise. Stamp reunited with producer Janni for two more projects: John Schlesinger's adaptation of Thomas Hardy's Far from the Madding Crowd (1967) co-starring Julie Christie and Alan Bates, and Ken Loach's first feature film Poor Cow (1967).

Stamp was approached to play the role of James Bond when Sean Connery retired from the role but did not receive a second call from producer Harry Saltzman because, in Stamp's opinion, "my ideas about [how the role should be portrayed] put the frighteners on Harry. I didn't get a second call from him."

Stamp then travelled to Italy to star in Federico Fellini's Toby Dammit, a 50-minute portion of the Edgar Allan Poe film adaptation Histoires extraordinaires (1968, aka Spirits of the Dead). Stamp lived in Italy for several years, during which time his film work included Pier Paolo Pasolini's Teorema (1968) opposite Silvana Mangano, and A Season in Hell (1971).

Stamp's additional film credits included starring roles in the American Western film Blue (1968) with Joanna Pettet and Karl Malden, the British-American science fiction film The Mind of Mr. Soames (1970), in which he played an infantile patient, the French science fiction film Hu-Man (1975) with Jeanne Moreau, and the Italian drama The Divine Nymph (1975, released in the US in 1979).

=== 1978–1999: Superman films and other roles ===
It was Stamp who transformed Superman's arch nemesis into a sadistic supervillain. The terrifying demand: 'Kneel before Zod!' is remembered as one of the most iconic moments in comic book film history.

— Terence Stamp: five best moments – 1. Superman II. Article published in The Guardian, February 2013.

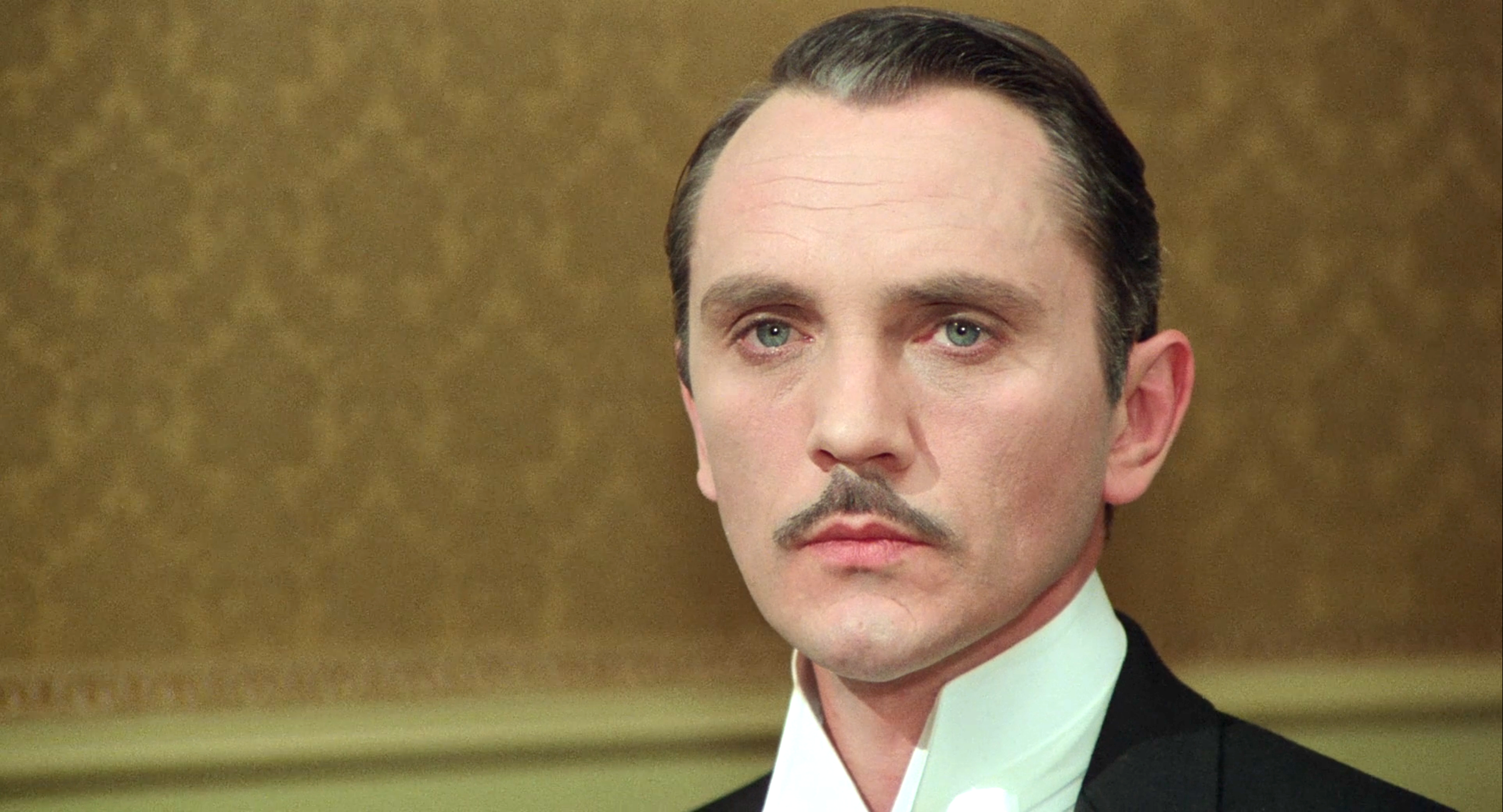
Stamp in The Divine Nymph (1975)

Stamp portrayed the Kryptonian supervillain General Zod in Richard Donner's Superman (1978), appearing in a scene with Marlon Brando. The film and its first sequel were originally conceived as one film, with Zod and his evil conspirators returning later in the film to challenge Superman, but the screenplay was so long that the producers elected to split it into two parts. Both parts began shooting simultaneously, but production on the sequel was halted partway through due to budget and time constraints. Stamp reappeared as General Zod in Superman II (1980), as the film's primary villain. Donner was replaced as director on the sequel with Richard Lester, who completed the film using portions of Donner's original footage combined with newly filmed scenes. Total Film magazine ranked Stamp's portrayal of General Zod No. 32 on their "Top 50 Greatest Villains of All Time" list in 2007. On the occasion of Superman's 50th anniversary in 1988, Stamp introduced the BBC Radio special Superman On Trial, which was produced by Dirk Maggs and starred Stuart Milligan as Superman. In 2003, Stamp returned to the Superman franchise in a new role, by portraying the voice of Clark Kent's biological father Jor-El in the WB/CW television series Smallville. He also provided the scream of Zod (being exorcised from the body of Lex Luthor) in the sixth-season premiere episode "Zod". In 2006, he appeared as Zod once again in Superman II: The Richard Donner Cut (a retooled version of the 1980 film, which features footage shot by Donner, the film's original director).

He also acted in Meetings with Remarkable Men (1979) and The Hit (1984), which won a Mystfest Award for Best Actor, shared with John Hurt and Tim Roth. Also in 1984, he had the opportunity to play the Devil in a cameo in The Company of Wolves. He also appeared in Link (1986), Legal Eagles (1986), The Sicilian (1987) and a cameo as Sir Larry Wildman in Wall Street (1987). He played the ranch owner, John Tunstall, in Young Guns (1988). His film Beltenebros (1992) (aka Prince of Shadows) was premiered at the 42nd Berlin International Film Festival. Stamp began his fourth decade as an actor wearing some of the choicest of Tim Chappel's Academy Award-winning costumes for the comedy The Adventures of Priscilla, Queen of the Desert (1994), which costarred Guy Pearce and Hugo Weaving.

In 1999, Stamp played a lead role in The Limey to widespread critical acclaim at the Cannes Film Festival. For his performance Stamp received nominations for Best Male Lead at the 2000 Independent Spirit Awards and for Best British Actor at the London Film Critics' Circle (ALFS) Awards. Also in 1999 Stamp appeared in the blockbuster Star Wars Episode I: The Phantom Menace as Chancellor Finis Valorum (an experience he later described as 'boring'), followed by Bowfinger (1999) and Red Planet (2000). He also appeared in Damian Pettigrew's award-winning documentary, Fellini: I'm a Born Liar (2002), offering ideas into the mind and working methods of Italian director Federico Fellini, with whom Stamp had worked in the 1960s.

=== 2000–2025: Later works and final roles ===
In later years Stamp appeared in the films Ma femme est une actrice (My Wife Is An Actress, 2001), My Boss's Daughter (2003), Disney's The Haunted Mansion (2003) and the superhero fantasy Elektra (2005). He filmed a cameo appearance for Mr & Mrs Smith, but his performance was cut from the movie. Stamp read the book Perfect Brilliant Stillness by David Carse for SilkSoundBooks. In his introductory reading, Stamp described his love for this book by saying, "Greater love hath no man". Stamp appeared in the music video for "At the Bottom of Everything" by Bright Eyes. Stamp appeared as the featured 'castaway' on BBC Radio's long-running Desert Island Discs in June 1987, and made a second appearance in March 2006 with a different selection of music. In 2002 Stamp provided the narration for History of Football: The Beautiful Game, a series on all aspects of the world's most popular sport. Stamp attended every England game (including the final) at the 1966 FIFA World Cup, and in July 2016 he narrated 1966 – A Nation Remembers shown on ITV, marking the 50th anniversary of England's World Cup victory. On 7 July 2007, Stamp gave a speech on climate change at the British leg of Live Earth in Wembley Stadium before introducing Madonna. His memoir, The Ocean Fell into the Drop, was published by Repeater Books in 2017. Stamp also narrated the BBC's The Story of Only Fools and Horses in 2017.

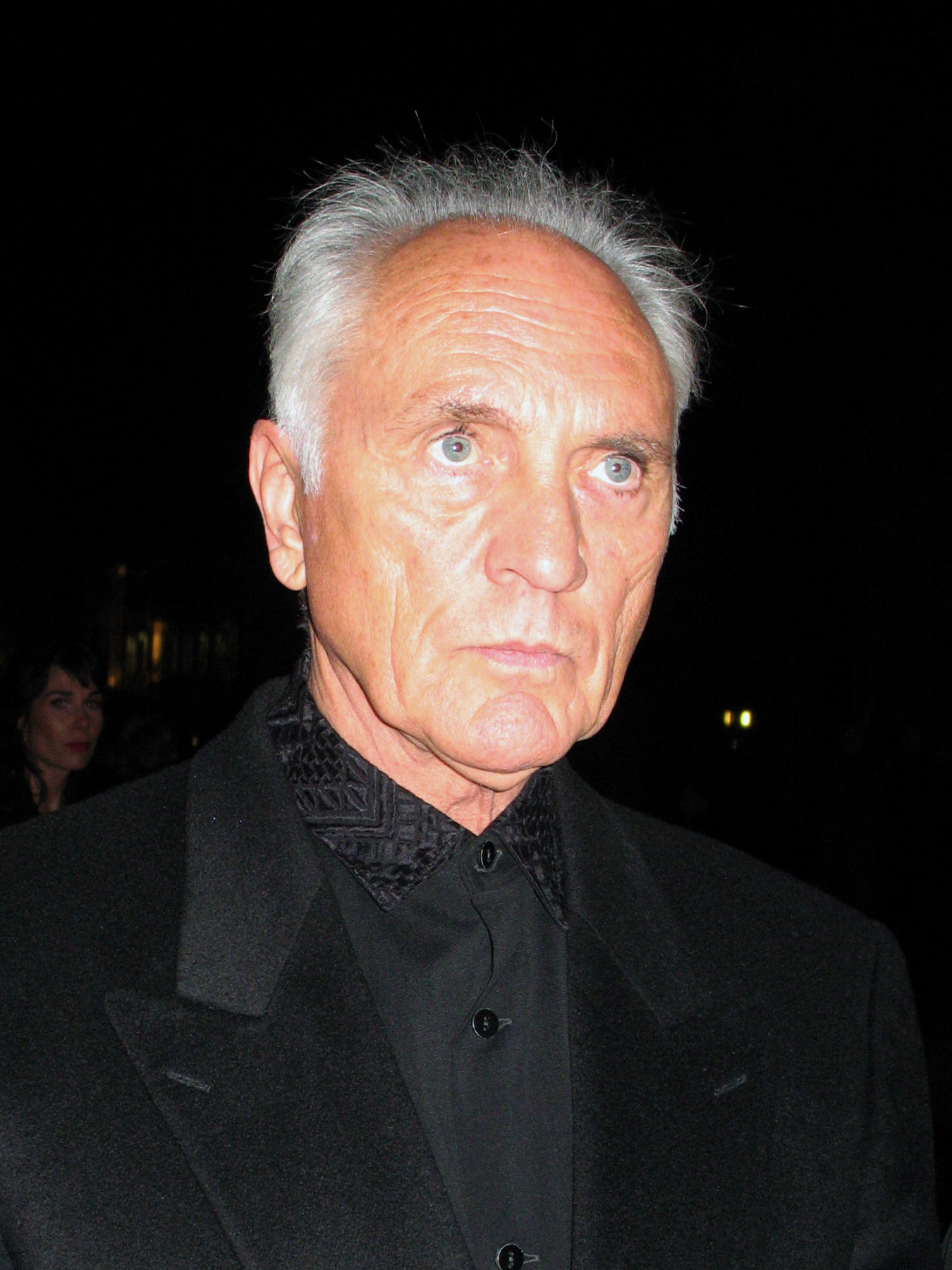
Stamp in 2009

In 2008 he appeared in the film remake of the spy comedy Get Smart; another comedy about the man who says yes to everything, Yes Man, opposite Jim Carrey; with Angelina Jolie, James McAvoy and Morgan Freeman in Wanted; and with Tom Cruise in Valkyrie, based on the true story of Colonel Claus von Stauffenberg's failed attempt to assassinate Adolf Hitler. In the 2010s Stamp appeared in The Adjustment Bureau (2011), an American romantic science-fiction thriller film loosely based on the Philip K. Dick short story "Adjustment Team" opposite Matt Damon. In 2012 Stamp appeared in the Peter Serafinowicz-directed music video for the Hot Chip song "Night & Day", portrayed a grumpy husband called Arthur in Paul Andrew Williams' Song for Marion (2012), opposite Gemma Arterton and a heist comedy The Art of the Steal (2013), with Kurt Russell, Matt Dillon and Jay Baruchel.

In 2014 Stamp appeared in Tim Burton's dramatic film Big Eyes, with Amy Adams and Christoph Waltz. In 2016, Stamp appeared in another Tim Burton film, Miss Peregrine's Home for Peculiar Children, where he played Abe, the grandfather of the film's protagonist Jake.

Stamp's voice acting credits included the video game The Elder Scrolls IV: Oblivion, where he voiced the villainous cult leader Mankar Camoran; and the films Zombie Island and These Foolish Things. Stamp voiced the Prophet of Truth in Halo 3, replacing Michael Wincott. In 2005, Stamp also narrated the BBC Four documentary Jazz Britannia, which chronicles the evolution of British jazz music.

Stamp's next project was Crooked House (2017), directed by Gilles Paquet-Brenner and starring Christina Hendricks, Gillian Anderson and Glenn Close. He also appears in George Mendeluk's Bitter Harvest, opposite Max Irons, Samantha Barks, Barry Pepper, and Aneurin Barnard.

In addition to his acting career, Stamp was an accomplished writer and author. He published three volumes of his memoirs, including Stamp Album (written in tribute to his late mother), a novel entitled The Night, and a cookbook co-written with Elizabeth Buxton to provide alternative recipes for those who are wheat- and lactose-intolerant.

In September 2025, director Stephan Elliott revealed Stamp pre-filmed all of his scenes for Priscilla Queen of the Desert 2 before his death, thus making the upcoming sequel his final performance.

== Personal life ==
=== Relationships ===
In the 1960s, Stamp shared a house with actor Michael Caine in Wimpole Street, London, before and during their rise to fame. In his autobiography, What's It All About (1992), Caine stated "I still wake up sweating in the night as I see Terence agreeing to accept my advice to take the role in Alfie."

Associated with the Swinging London scene of the 1960s, during which time he was in high-profile relationships with actress Julie Christie and supermodel Jean Shrimpton, Stamp was among the subjects photographed by David Bailey for a set titled Box of Pin-Ups. He and Shrimpton were one of the most-photographed couples of Mod London. After Shrimpton ended her relationship with Stamp, he moved to India and spent time at the ashram of Krishnamurti.

On New Year's Eve 2002, Stamp married for the only time at the age of 64. His 29-year-old bride was Elizabeth O'Rourke, whom Stamp first met in the mid-1990s at a chemist's shop in Bondi, New South Wales. Of Irish-Australian and Indian-Singaporean parentage, O'Rourke was raised in Singapore before moving to Australia in her early twenties to study pharmacology. The couple divorced on the grounds of his "unreasonable behaviour" in April 2008.

=== Interests ===
Stamp's brother Chris became a rock music record producer and manager credited with helping to bring the Who to prominence during the 1960s, launching the career of Jimi Hendrix and co-founding Track Records. In 1984, the band the Smiths released their third single, "What Difference Does It Make?", and its single cover was a photograph taken on the set of the film The Collector (but not depicted in the film). Stamp originally refused permission for the still to be used, and some pressings featured lead singer Morrissey in a re-enacted scene. In the re-enactment Morrissey is holding a glass of milk, as opposed to the chloroform pad of the original. Eventually, Stamp changed his mind, and the original cover was reinstated.

== Death and tributes ==
Stamp died in a care home in Bickley in south east London on 17 August 2025, aged 87. Filmmaker Edgar Wright, who directed him in Last Night in Soho (2021), wrote in part, "Terence was kind, funny, and endlessly fascinating. I loved ... reminiscing about his films, going back to his debut in Billy Budd. Terence was a true movie star: the camera loved him, and he loved it right back". Others who paid tribute included Guy Pearce, Gale Anne Hurd, Lou Diamond Phillips, Michael McKean, Billy Idol, and Stephan Elliott.

An auction of Stamp's memorabilia and personal items, including birthday cards, clothing, correspondence, costumes, photographs and scripts was held at Bonhams auction house in June 2026, fetching in excess of £240,000.

== Acting credits and accolades ==
=== Awards and nominations ===
Organizations	Year	Category	Nominated work	Result	Ref.
Academy Awards	1962	Best Supporting Actor	Billy Budd	Nominated	
AACTA Awards	1994	Best Actor in a Leading Role	The Adventures of Priscilla, Queen of the Desert	Nominated	
AARP Movies for Grownups Awards	2013	Best Grownup Love Story (Note: Shared with Vanessa Redgrave.)	Song for Marion	Nominated	
Beijing International Film Festival	2013	Best Actor	Song for Marion	Won	
British Academy Film Awards	1962	Most Promising Newcomer to Leading Film Roles	Billy Budd	Nominated	
British Academy Film Awards	1994	Best Actor in a Leading Role	The Adventures of Priscilla, Queen of the Desert	Nominated	
British Independent Film Awards	2012	Best Actor	Song for Marion	Nominated	
Cannes Film Festival	1965	Best Actor	The Collector	Won	
Golden Globe Awards	1962	Most Promising Newcomer – Male	Billy Budd	Won	
Golden Globe Awards	1994	Best Actor in a Motion Picture – Musical or Comedy	The Adventures of Priscilla, Queen of the Desert	Nominated	
Independent Spirit Awards	1999	Best Male Lead	The Limey	Nominated	
Las Vegas Film Critics Society	1999	Best Actor	The Limey	Nominated	
Mystfest	1984	Best Actor (Note: Shared with John Hurt and Tim Roth.)	The Hit	Won	
San Francisco International Film Festival	2011	Peter J. Owens Award	Himself	Won	
Satellite Awards	1999	Best Actor in a Motion Picture – Drama	The Limey	Won	
Satellite Awards	2012	Mary Pickford Award	Himself	Won	
Seattle International Film Festival	1994	Best Actor	The Adventures of Priscilla, Queen of the Desert	Won	
Seattle International Film Festival	2012	Best Actor	Song for Marion	2nd Place	

== Bibliography ==
=== Memoirs and reflections ===
- Stamp, Terence (1987). Stamp Album. Bloomsbury Publishing. ISBN 9780747500322.
- Stamp, Terence (1988). Coming Attractions. Bloomsbury Publishing. ISBN 9780747501862.
- Stamp, Terence (1989). Double Feature. Bloomsbury Publishing. ISBN 9780747503934.
- Stamp, Terence (2012). Rare Stamps: Reflections on Living, Breathing, and Acting. Escargot Books. ISBN 9781908191380.
- Stamp, Terence (2017). The Ocean Fell into the Drop: A Memoir. Repeater Books. ISBN 9781910924532.

=== Fiction ===
- Stamp, Terence (1993). The Night. Orion Publishing Co. ISBN 9781857990089.

=== Cooking ===
- Buxton, Elizabeth; Stamp, Terence (1997). The Stamp Collection Cookbook. Ebury Press. ISBN 9780091854133.
- Buxton, Elizabeth; Stamp, Terence (2002). The Wheat and Dairy Free Cookbook. Ebury Press. ISBN 9780091888930.
