= Priscilla Queen of the Desert 2 =

Upcoming film by Stephan Elliott

Priscilla, Queen of the Desert 2
- Directed by: Stephan Elliott
- Written by: Stephan Elliott
- Produced by: Stephan Elliott
- Starring: Terence Stamp; Hugo Weaving; Guy Pearce
- Country: Australia
- Language: English

Priscilla, Queen of the Desert 2 is an upcoming Australian road comedy film written and directed by Stephan Elliott. It serves as the sequel to the 1994 film The Adventures of Priscilla, Queen of the Desert. The film features Hugo Weaving, Guy Pearce, and Terence Stamp in his final film role, posthumously.

== Plot ==
Elliott described the story as, "Not what people expect… it is about old age... I wrote into the script of what it's like to get old and to be either gay, trans—I mean, it's a subject that's never been explored."

== Cast ==
- Terence Stamp as Bernadette
- Hugo Weaving as Anthony "Tick" Belrose / Mitzi Del Bra
- Guy Pearce as Adam Whitely / Felicia Jollygoodfellow

== Production ==
=== Development ===
In April 2024, Elliott announced that work on the sequel was underway, with the original main cast reprising their roles. After Stamp died on 17 August 2025, Elliott told The Guardian: "[Stamp] agreed to do the sequel a few years ago and we've been particularly busy over the past year."

=== Filming ===
In September 2025, Elliott revealed that, with the blessing of the cast and financiers, Stamp spent his final months pre-filming all of his scenes using a "nine-camera array of the entire script" after expressing opposition to a digital clone portraying Bernadette. He expressed a want to "put the character down himself" in case he did not survive to the start of filming. During shooting, a stand-in actor will play Stamp's role, and in post-production his face will be replaced with Stamp's pre-recorded face.

== See also ==
- Cinema of Australia
- List of cult films
- Transgender characters in film and television
