= The Divine Nymph =

- Directed by: Giuseppe Patroni Griffi
- Written by: Giuseppe Patroni Griffi; Alfio Valdarnini; Luciano Zuccoli (novel)
- Starring: Laura Antonelli; Terence Stamp; Marcello Mastroianni; Michele Placido; Duilio Del Prete; Ettore Manni; Carlo Tamberlani; Cecilia Polizzi; Piero Di Iorio; Marina Berti; Doris Duranti
- Cinematography: Giuseppe Rotunno
- Edited by: Roberto Perpignani
- Music by: Cesare Andrea Bixio
- Distributed by: Analysis Film Releasing Corporation
- Release dates: 16 October 1975 (Italy); 12 October 1979 (US)
- Running time: 118 minutes
- Country: Italy
- Languages: Italian; English

The Divine Nymph (Italian: Divina creatura) is a 1975 Italian drama film directed by Giuseppe Patroni Griffi and starring Laura Antonelli, Marcello Mastroianni, Michele Placido and Terence Stamp. It was entered into the 26th Berlin International Film Festival. It was distributed in the U.S. by Analysis Film Releasing Corp.

== Plot ==
During the Roaring Twenties, a beautiful woman is engaged to one man, but has an affair with both a young nobleman and later his cousin, playing them against each other.

== Cast ==
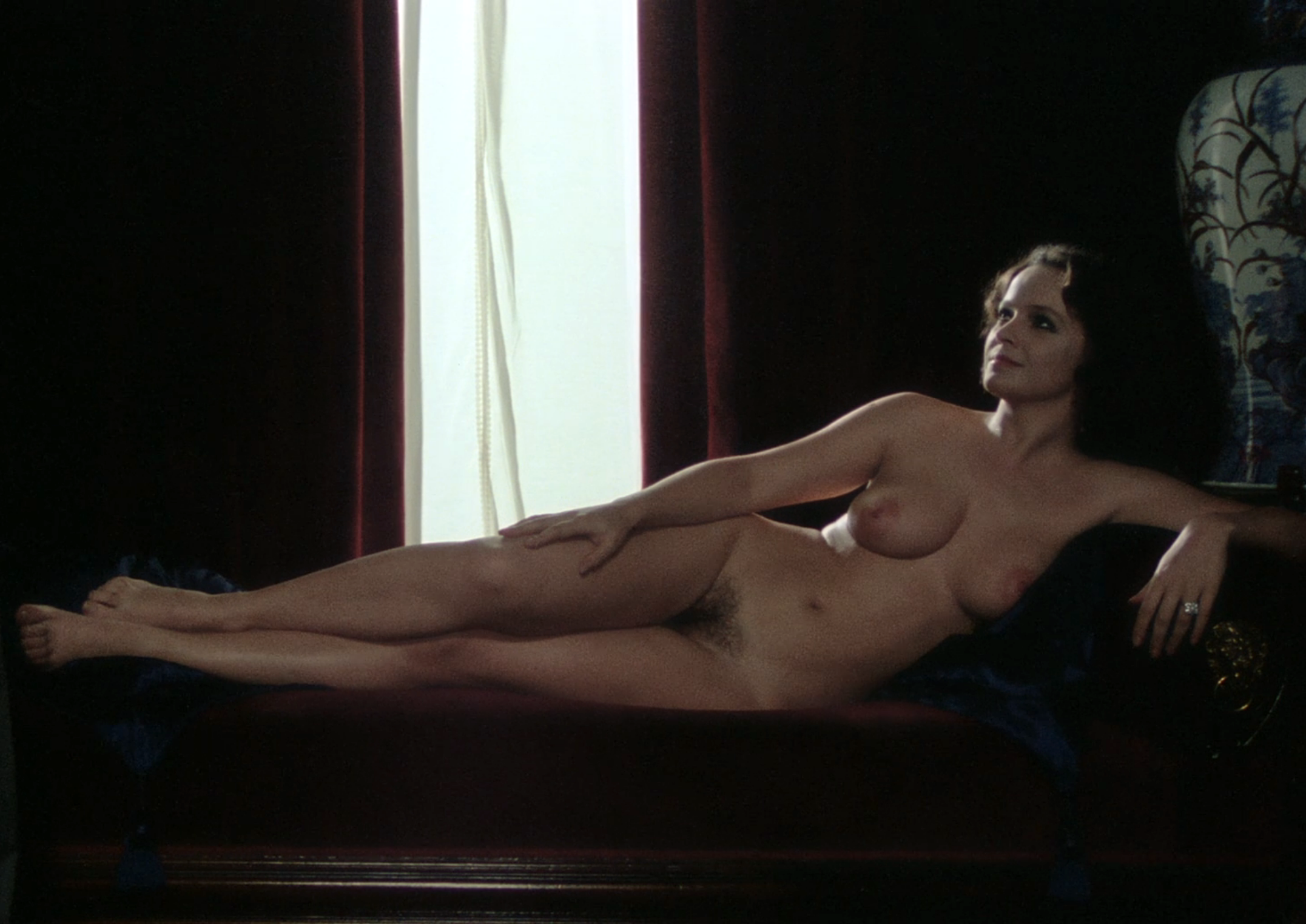
Antonelli in The Divine Nymph (1975)

- Laura Antonelli - Manoela Roderighi
- Terence Stamp - Dany di Bagnasco
- Michele Placido - Martino Ghiondelli
- Duilio Del Prete - Armellini
- Ettore Manni - Marco Pisani
- Carlo Tamberlani - Majordomo Pasqualino
- Cecilia Polizzi - Dany's Maid
- Piero Di Iorio - Cameriere di Stefano
- Marina Berti - Manoela's Aunt
- Doris Duranti - Signora Fones
- Marcello Mastroianni - Michele Barra
- Tina Aumont
- Rita Silva
- Corrado Annicelli
- Gino Cassani

== See also ==
- List of Italian films of 1975
