= The Adventures of Priscilla, Queen of the Desert =

1994 Australian film by Stephan Elliott

- Theatrical release poster
- Directed by: Stephan Elliott
- Written by: Stephan Elliott
- Produced by: Al Clark; Michael Hamlyn
- Starring: Terence Stamp; Hugo Weaving; Guy Pearce; Bill Hunter
- Cinematography: Brian J. Breheny
- Edited by: Sue Blainey
- Music by: Guy Gross
- Production companies: Latent Image Productions; PolyGram Filmed Entertainment; Specific Films
- Distributed by: Roadshow Film Distributors
- Release dates: 15 May 1994 (Cannes); 8 September 1994 (Australia)
- Running time: 103 minutes
- Country: Australia
- Language: English
- Budget: A$1.8 million (US$1.3 million)
- Box office: $29.7 million

The Adventures of Priscilla, Queen of the Desert is a 1994 Australian road comedy film written and directed by Stephan Elliott. The plot follows two drag queens (played by Hugo Weaving and Guy Pearce) and a transgender woman (Terence Stamp), as they journey across the Australian Outback on a tour bus named Priscilla, along the way encountering various groups and individuals. The film was based upon the lives of three actual drag queens—Cindy Pastel, Strykermeyer, and Lady Bump—who were to play themselves but were later replaced with what the studio considered "bankable" actors.

Priscilla, Queen of the Desert premiered at the 1994 Cannes Film Festival, in the Un Certain Regard section. Upon its wide release, it became a surprise worldwide hit and its positive portrayal of LGBT individuals helped to introduce queer themes to a mainstream audience. It received predominantly positive reviews and won Best Costume Design at the 67th Academy Awards. The film is one of only three films set in contemporary times to win the award for Best Costume Design. It became a cult classic both in Australia and abroad. The film provided the basis for a musical, Priscilla, Queen of the Desert, which opened in 2006 in Sydney. A sequel, Priscilla Queen of the Desert 2, is, as of 2025, in the process of preparing to be filmed.

== Plot ==
Anthony "Tick" Belrose, using the pseudonym of Mitzi Del Bra, is a Sydney-based drag queen who accepts an offer to perform his act at Lasseters Hotel Casino Resort—managed by his estranged wife Marion—in Alice Springs, in remote central Australia. After persuading his friends and fellow performers, Bernadette Bassenger, a recently bereaved transgender woman, and Adam Whitely, a flamboyant and obnoxious younger drag queen who goes under the drag name Felicia Jollygoodfellow, to join him, the three set out for a four-week run at the casino in a large tour bus, which Adam christens "Priscilla, Queen of the Desert."

The trio proceed through remote lands bordering the Simpson Desert meeting a variety of characters. Early on, Tick reveals that Marion is actually his wife, as they never divorced, and that they are going there as a favor to her. They stop in Broken Hill, where they are subjected to homophobic/transphobic abuse and violence, including having their bus vandalized with homophobic and transphobic graffiti.

After they leave the main highway to save time, their bus breaks down in the middle of the desert. Adam spends the whole day repainting the bus in lavender to cover the graffiti. After a homophobic couple turn up but leave them stranded, a group of friendly Aboriginal Australians with whom they perform at a corroboree, help them get Priscilla to Bob, a middle-aged mechanic, in a small outback town. Bob is delighted to see drag performers in his small town and ultimately joins them for the remainder of the journey after his Filipina wife Cynthia leaves him.

Continuing their journey, they stop for repairs at the remote opal-mining town of Coober Pedy, where Adam is attacked by a homophobic gang. Bob and Bernadette save him. Bernadette comforts the shaken Adam, allowing them to reach an understanding. As they near Alice Springs, the others come to terms with the secret of Tick's marriage and resolve their differences.

Upon arrival at the hotel, it is revealed that Tick and Marion also have an eight-year-old son, Benji, whom Tick has not seen for many years. Tick is nervous about exposing his son to his drag profession and anxious about revealing his homosexuality. He is surprised to discover that Benji already knows and is fully supportive. While Benji is playing with Adam, he reveals that Marion has previously been in a lesbian relationship.

Tick and Adam and the group go on a trip into the outback, where Marion insists that Benji go back to Sydney with them so that Tick can get to know him better. Tick and Benji are talking by the river, and Tick hesitantly talks to Benji about what he does for a living, to which Benji replies "Mum says you're the best in the business." Before returning to the hotel to finish out their run of shows, the three travellers fulfill a long-held dream of Adam's, to climb Kings Canyon (Watarrka) in full drag regalia.

When the others are loading the bus to return to Sydney, Bernadette announces she has decided to remain at the resort with Bob. Marion has arranged for her to manage the hotel’s entertainment at the hotel during Marion’s absence.

The film ends with Tick and Adam performing in the same club featured in the opening credits, with the crowd (including Benji working spotlight) cheering on encouragingly.

In a post-credits scene, the dummy attached to a kite that was released earlier in the film is revealed to have travelled to Tibet and landed in a temple where a monk recovers it.

== Cast ==
- Terence Stamp as Bernadette Bassenger
- Hugo Weaving as Anthony "Tick" Belrose / Mitzi Del Bra
- Guy Pearce as Adam Whitely / Felicia Jollygoodfellow
- Bill Hunter as Robert "Bob" Spart
- Sarah Chadwick as Marion Barber
- Mark Holmes as Benjamin "Benji" Barber
- Julia Cortez as Cynthia
- Alan Dargin as Alan
- Ken Radley as Frank
- Daniel Kellie as Young Bernadette
- Leighton Picken as Young Adam
- Margaret Pomeranz (uncredited) as Adam's mother
- Stephan Elliott (uncredited) as Doorman

== Production ==
=== Development ===
The film was based on the lives of three drag queens who performed as Cindy Pastel (Ritchie Finger), Strykermeyer (Mark Fitzhugh), and Lady Bump (Stuart Garske). Carlotta has also claimed to have inspired the film, in particular the character of Bernadette. Carlotta performed with Les Girls throughout her career, who are mentioned by name in Priscilla several times. In her autobiography she also recalls touring outback Australia in a bus with Les Girls and "props hanging out the back... way before Priscilla was ever thought of as a movie".

The original concept for Priscilla was to have Cindy Pastel, Strykermeyer and Lady Bump playing themselves, but this was scrapped once the film attracted a large budget, as it was decided "bankable" actors were needed. This ultimately led to the casting of three straight men with no background in drag, and as The Age wrote, "the people upon whose lives the mega-hit was based were overlooked". The three original queens were profiled in the 1995 documentary Ladies Please.

Priscilla, Queen of the Desert had been conceived (mainly out of frustation) by filmmaker Stephan Elliott while he waited for a response from Phil Collins about his participation in the film Frauds. Elliott, in an effort to distract himself, wrote a script in just 10 days, but one which felt at the time to be "tricky" to pull off. Rebel Penfold-Russell, Andrena Finlay and Stuart Quin (the co-founders of the production company Latent Image) pitched Priscilla to various financiers at the 1991 Cannes Film Festival, without success; however, before Cannes, they had taken the project to Sarah Radclyffe at Working Title, who took the film's concept to PolyGram with Graeme Mason, who suggested Michael Hamlyn as the British co-producer and, with the backing of the Australian Film Finance Corporation, were able to begin production of the film on a relatively modest budget of 2.7 million Australian dollars.

Elliott and the film's eventual producers, Michael Hamlyn and Al Clark, agreed to work for $50,000 each, a relatively low fee for filmmakers at the time, while the lack of funding meant that the crew agreed to receive takings of the film's eventual profits in compensation for their low salaries. Due to the involvement of the Australian FFC, only one non-Australian actor was allowed to appear in the film, and Clark initially considered David Bowie, whom he had known back in the 1980s, and later briefly thought of John Hurt, although neither was available.

=== Casting ===
The idea of casting the actual drag queens upon whom the story was based was abandoned when the producers decided to seek out "bankable" straight actors without a background in drag instead. In May 1993, after travelling around the Australian Outback searching for appropriate sites to film in, Priscilla's creators attended the Cannes Film Festival and Marche to advertise their project, hoping to capitalise on the selection of Elliot's first film Frauds, which was "In Competition" at the festival and despite the fact that they had not yet confirmed any actors for the roles. Their primary choice for the role of Bernadette was Tony Curtis, who read and approved of the script, but eventually became unavailable. They then approached John Cleese, who was not interested.

For the part of Tick, they had initially wanted Rupert Everett and for Adam they wanted Jason Donovan. However, at a pre-production casting meeting held at Cannes, Everett and Donovan did not get on well with one another and were found to be openly hostile toward the production staff. In light of this, it was readily agreed that they would not be suitable for the parts and the search for their three leading men would resume. However, Donovan would go on to play Tick in the West End musical adaptation of the film.

After unsuccessfully lobbying Colin Firth to play the role of Tick, producers eventually awarded the part to Hugo Weaving. Initially considering Tim Curry for the part of Bernadette, they cast Terence Stamp, who was initially anxious about the role because it was unlike anything that he had performed previously, although he eventually came on board with the concept. Stamp himself suggested Bill Hunter for the role of Bob, who accepted the role without even reading the script or being told anything about the greater concept of the film other than the basic character description, while Australian actor Guy Pearce (who had previously appeared with Donovan in the Australian soap opera Neighbours in the late 1980s) was hired at the eleventh hour to portray the sassy but spirited Adam.

=== Filming ===
It is striking what an effect the disguise of drag is having on [the actors'] personalities. It makes Guy [Pearce] flirtatious, combative and loud. It makes Terence [Stamp] withdrawn and watchful ("Hello sailor", he greets me warily with his back to the wall, looking like a fallen woman in a '50s melodrama.) It makes Hugo extraordinarily trashy.

— Al Clark

The Imperial Hotel in Erskineville, Sydney was the filming location for the opening and closing scenes. The Imperial Hotel has hosted drag shows since 1983, and continues to be an icon for Sydney's LGBT community, with its restaurant renamed "Priscillas" in honour of the film. Many scenes, including one where Bernadette encounters a butch, bigoted woman named Shirley, were filmed at the outback town of Broken Hill in New South Wales, largely in a hotel named Mario's Palace (now simply the Palace Hotel), which Al Clark believed was "drag queen heaven". Some small scenes were filmed in the All Nations Hotel.

They also decided to film at Coober Pedy, a remote rough-and-tumble opal mining town in south-central Australia which featured prominently in the film. The executive producer, Rebel Penfold-Russell, appears as the marathon runner.

Initially, they tried to get permission to film upon Uluṟu, but this was rejected by organisations responsible for the monument, such as the Uluṟu Board of Management, as it would have been in violation of Indigenous Australian religious beliefs. Instead, the scene was filmed in Kings Canyon (Watarrka). Dialogue from the scene was rewritten slightly to accommodate the new location.

=== Post-production ===
With filming over, the director and producers began editing the footage, repeatedly travelling to both London and to Los Angeles, which had then just been hit by the 1994 Northridge earthquake. Scenes were deleted on the advice of early viewers to shorten the film.

== Release ==
=== Box office ===
The Adventures of Priscilla, Queen of the Desert took $18,459,245 at the box office in Australia, which is equivalent to $37,763,000 in 2022. It was the fifth highest-grossing Australian film in Australia of all time.

Being an Australian film, not an American-produced Hollywood blockbuster, Priscilla was released as a minor commercial product in North America and other English-speaking nations.

Director Elliott noted that the audiences viewing the film in Australia, the United States, and France all reacted to it differently, going on to state that "At a screening we had for an Australian audience, they laughed at all the Aussieisms. The Americans laughed too, but at different jokes. There is a line where Tick says, 'Bernadette has left her cake out in the rain...', the Americans laughed for ten minutes." Tom O'Regan, a scholar of film studies, remarked that the film actually carried different meanings for members of different nationalities and subcultural groups, with LGBT Americans believing that the film was "the big one that will bring gay lifestyles into the mainstream", while Australians tended to "embrace it as just another successful Australian film".

=== Critical reaction ===
On Rotten Tomatoes, Priscilla has a 94% rating based on 47 reviews, with an average rating of 7.3/10; the consensus states: "While its premise is ripe for comedy – and it certainly delivers its fair share of laughs – Priscilla is also a surprisingly tender and thoughtful road movie with some outstanding performances." Metacritic gives a 70 out of 100 rating, based on 20 critics.

American film critic Roger Ebert of the Chicago Sun-Times felt that Bernadette was the key part of the film, stating that "the real subject of the movie is not homosexuality, not drag queens, not showbiz, but simply the life of a middle-aged person trapped in a job that has become tiresome". Janet Maslin of The New York Times wrote "The Adventures of Priscilla, Queen of the Desert presents a defiant culture clash in generous, warmly entertaining ways." Peter Travers of Rolling Stone commented "In this roaringly comic and powerfully affecting road movie, Terence Stamp gives one of the year's best performances." Kenneth Turan from the Los Angeles Times wrote "The comic pizazz and bawdy dazzle of this film's vision of gaudy drag performers trekking across the Australian outback certainly has a boisterous, addictive way about it."

== Accolades ==
=== Year-end lists ===
- 7th – Sean P. Means, The Salt Lake Tribune
- 7th – Michael Mills, The Palm Beach Post
- Top 10 (listed alphabetically, not ranked) – Matt Zoller Seitz, Dallas Observer
- Top 10 Runner-ups – Bob Ross, The Tampa Tribune
- Best "sleepers" (not ranked) – Dennis King, Tulsa World
- Honorable mention – Dan Craft, The Pantagraph

=== Awards ===
Award	Category	Subject	Result
AACTA Award	Best Film	Al Clark, Michael Hamlyn	Nominated
AACTA Award	Best Direction	Stephan Elliott	Nominated
AACTA Award	Best Original Screenplay	Stephan Elliott	Nominated
AACTA Award	Best Actor	Terence Stamp	Nominated
AACTA Award	Best Actor	Hugo Weaving	Nominated
AACTA Award	Best Cinematography	Brian J. Breheny	Nominated
AACTA Award	Best Original Music Score	Guy Gross	Nominated
AACTA Award	Best Production Design	Owen Paterson	Won
AACTA Award	Best Costume Design	Tim Chappel, Lizzy Gardiner	Won
Academy Awards	Best Costume Design	Tim Chappel, Lizzy Gardiner	Won
BAFTA Awards	Best Costume Design	Tim Chappel, Lizzy Gardiner	Won
BAFTA Awards	Best Original Screenplay	Stephan Elliott	Nominated
BAFTA Awards	Best Actor	Terence Stamp	Nominated
BAFTA Awards	Best Production Design	Colin Gibson, Owen Paterson	Nominated
BAFTA Awards	Best Makeup and Hair	Angela Conte, Cassie Hanlon, Strykermeyer	Won
BAFTA Awards	Best Cinematography	Brian J. Breheny	Nominated
GLAAD Media Award	Outstanding Film – Wide Release		Won
Golden Globe Awards	Best Motion Picture – Musical or Comedy		Nominated
Golden Globe Awards	Best Actor - Motion Picture Musical or Comedy	Terence Stamp	Nominated
Outfest	Audience Award for Outstanding Narrative Feature	Stephan Elliott	Won
Seattle International Film Festival	Golden Space Needle Award for Best Film		Won
Seattle International Film Festival	Golden Space Needle Award for Best Actor	Terence Stamp	Won
Writers Guild of America	Best Original Screenplay	Stephan Elliott	Nominated

The film was ranked 7th on Logo's 50 Greatest Films with an LGBT theme, and #10 on AfterElton's Fifty Greatest Gay Movies list.

=== Cultural impact and legacy ===
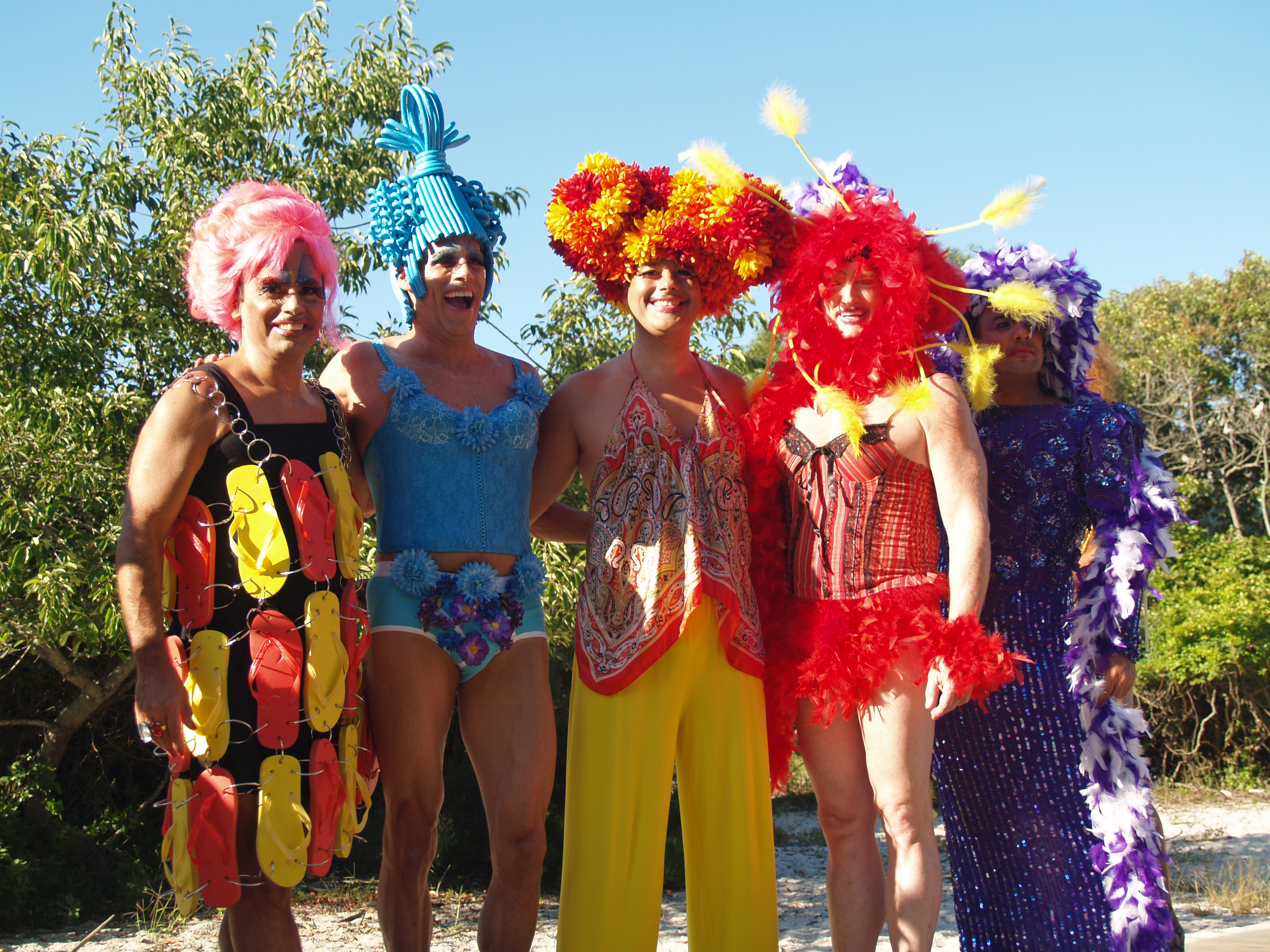
A drag queen homage to the film's costumes on Fire Island Pines

Priscilla, along with other contemporary Australian films Young Einstein (1988), Sweetie (1989), Strictly Ballroom (1992), and Muriel's Wedding (1994), provided Australian cinema with a reputation for "quirkiness", "eccentricity" and "individuality" across the world. Both Priscilla and Muriel's Wedding (which had also featured a soundtrack containing ABBA songs) in particular became cult classics, not only in their native Australia, but also in the United Kingdom, where a wave of Australian influences, such as the soap operas Neighbours and Home & Away, had made their mark in the late 1980s and early 1990s.

In 1995, an American film, To Wong Foo, Thanks for Everything! Julie Newmar, was released, featuring three drag queens who travel across the United States. According to Al Clark, the creators of Priscilla heard about the film while shooting theirs, and "for a moment [were] troubled" until they read the script of To Wong Foo, when they decided that it was sufficiently different from Priscilla to not be a commercial and critical threat. To Wong Foo had a mixed critical response in comparison to Priscilla, but was a box office success in North America as it was a film from a major Hollywood studio and starred big-name actors. Like Priscilla, To Wong Foo has also enjoyed a cult following.

During the 2000 Summer Olympics closing ceremony, Priscilla was part of a parade of images of Australian popular culture. A 1980 Denning (resembling the bus used in the film) featuring a giant steel stiletto heel which extended from and retracted into the roof – inspired by scenes from the film – paraded around the Olympic Stadium. The bus was accompanied by several stiletto heel tricycle floats and drag queens in big wigs in tribute to the film's international success and the local Sydney gay community. The music video for Iggy Azalea's 2013 single "Work" paid homage to scenes from the film.

The bus used in the film, which was a 1976 Hino Freighter from Japan, was rediscovered in 2019 at a property in Ewingar, New South Wales. A campaign was launched by the History Trust of South Australia, with the help of the Government of South Australia to restore the bus for eventual display in the National Motor Museum, Birdwood. As of April 2024 restoration works on the vehicle were taking place in Brisbane.

=== Racism and sexism controversy ===
The film has come under criticism for alleged racist and sexist elements, particularly in the portrayal of the Filipina character, Cynthia. Melba Marginson of the Centre for Filipino Concerns stated that Cynthia was portrayed as "a gold-digger, a prostitute, an entertainer whose expertise is popping out ping-pong balls from her sex-organ, a manic depressive, loud and vulgar. The worst stereotype of the Filipina." She argued that, by portraying Cynthia in this manner, the filmmakers were "violently kill[ing]" the dignity of Filipina women, something that she feared would lead to "more violence against us." An editor writing in The Age echoed these concerns, highlighting that "It is perhaps a pity that a film with a message of tolerance and acceptance for homosexuals should feel the need of what looks very much to us like a racist and sexist stereotype." Similarly, in his study of bisexuality in cinema, Wayne M. Bryant argued that while it was "an excellent film", The Adventures of Priscilla was marred by "instances of gratuitous sexism."

Producer Clark defended the film against these accusations, arguing that while Cynthia was a stereotype, it was not the purpose of filmmakers to avoid the portrayal of "vulnerable characters" from specific minority backgrounds. He stated that she was "a misfit like the three protagonists are, and just about everybody else in the film is, and her presence is no more a statement about Filipino women than having three drag queens is a statement about Australian men." Tom O'Regan noted that as a result of this controversy, the film gained "an ambiguous reputation."

== Soundtrack ==
The film featured a soundtrack made up of pre-existing "camp classics" (pop music songs that have a particular fanbase in the LGBT community). The original plan by the film's creators was to have a Kylie Minogue song in the finale, although it was later decided that an ABBA song would be more appropriate because its "tacky qualities" were "more timeless" (although in the musical adaptation, the character Adam performs a medley of Kylie Minogue songs atop Uluṟu). The film itself featured four main songs, which were performed by two or more of the drag queens as a part of their show within the film; "I've Never Been to Me" by Charlene, "I Will Survive" by Gloria Gaynor, "Finally" by CeCe Peniston, and "Mamma Mia" by ABBA. On 23 August 1994, Fontana Island released the soundtrack on CD.

Original music for the soundtrack was composed by Guy Gross, with choral and instrumental arrangements by Derek Williams, and released separately on CD.

== Sequel ==
In April 2024, Elliott announced that work on a sequel was underway, with the original main cast reprising their roles. After Stamp died on 17 August 2025, Elliott told The Guardian: "[Stamp] agreed to do the sequel a few years ago and we've been particularly busy over the past year." In September 2025, Elliot revealed that, with the blessing of the cast and financiers, Stamp spent the final months of his life pre-filming all of his scenes with "a nine-camera array of the entire script".

== Home media ==
On 14 November 1995, the film was released on VHS. On 7 October 1997, it was released on DVD with a collectable trivia booklet.

In 2004, a 10th Anniversary Collector's Edition was released on DVD in Australia with the following special features: a feature-length audio commentary with writer/director Stephan Elliott, three deleted scenes, two featurettes: "Behind the Bus: Priscilla with Her Pants Down" and Ladies Please, cast and crew biographies, the original Australian theatrical trailer, US theatrical and teaser trailers, and a number of hidden features

In 2006, it was re-released on DVD in Australia with the following special features: a feature-length audio commentary with writer/director Elliott, "Birth of a Queen" (featurette), deleted scenes, tidbits from the Set, "The Bus from Blooperville" – Gag reel documentary, a photo gallery, and US theatrical and teaser trailers.

On 5 June 2007, it was re-released in the United States as the "Extra Frills Edition" DVD. This edition includes the same special features as the Australian 2006 re-release. On 7 June 2011, it was released for US Blu-ray.

On August 24, 2024, it was announced that Imprint Films will release a 4K collector's edition of the film, restored from the 35mm print. It will host both new and legacy special features, including the 2015 documentary Between a Frock and a Hard Place that details the lasting impact of the film.

== See also ==
- To Wong Foo, Thanks for Everything! Julie Newmar, a similar road trip film about drag queens
- Cinema of Australia
- List of cult films
- Transgender characters in film and television

== Bibliography ==
- Brophy, Philip (2008). Australian Screen Classics: The Adventures of Priscilla, Queen of the Desert. Currency Press. ISBN 978-0-86819-821-7.
- Bryant, Wayne M. (1997). Bisexual Characters in Film: From Anaïs to Zee. Binghamton, New York: The Haworth Press. doi:10.4324/9781315869971. ISBN 978-0-7890-0142-9.
- Clark, Al (1994). Making Priscilla. New York and London: Penguin. ISBN 978-0-452-27484-6.
- Epstein, Jan (October 1994). "Stephan Elliott". Cinema Papers (101): 04–10. ISSN 0311-3639.
- Miller, Helen (1998). "Race, Nationality and Gender in The Adventures of Priscilla: Queen of the Desert". In Asia Pacific Research Group (ed.). Gender in Asia: Gender, Culture and Society in the Asia Pacific Subgroup. Rockhampton, Queensland: Central Queensland University. ISBN 978-1-875902-84-2.
- O'Regan, Tom (1996). Australian National Cinema. London: Routledge. ISBN 978-0-415-05730-1.
- Riggs, Damien W. (2006). Priscilla, (White) Queen of the Desert: Queer Rights/Race Privilege. New York: Peter Lang. ISBN 978-0-8204-8658-1.
- Turner, Alwyn W. (2010). Rejoice! Rejoice! Britain in the 1980s. London: Aurum Press. ISBN 978-1-84513-525-6.
- Padva, Gilad (2000). "Priscilla Fights Back: The Politicization of Camp Subculture". Journal of Communication Inquiry. 24 (2). Thousand Oaks, California: Sage Publications: 216–243. doi:10.1177/0196859900024002007. ISSN 1552-4612. S2CID 144510862.
