= Health Equity Matters =

Australian non-profit organisation

- Founded: 1987
- Purpose: HIV, advocacy, policy, health promotion
- Location: Sydney
- Region served: Australia / Asia-Pacific
- Key people: Mark Orr (President)
- Website: healthequitymatters.org.au

Health Equity Matters, formerly the Australian Federation of AIDS Organisations (AFAO), is an Australian non-profit organisation that aims to end health inequity for its diverse communities, with HIV the core of its mission until the epidemic is over for everyone. To do this in Australia it brings together the leading HIV and LGBTIQA+ health organisations in each state and territory and other national member organisations representing communities affected by HIV, and leverage its relationships, expertise and advocacy to give them a unified voice to federal government on HIV and LGBTIQA+ health.

The Australian Federal Government's latest HIV Taskforce Report, released in November 2023, will inform the 9th National HIV Strategy that will help ramp up Australia's efforts to eliminate HIV transmission by 2030.

Internationally, Health Equity Matters' SKPA-2 Program (Sustainability of HIV Services for Key Populations in Southeast Asia) works with governments and communities to scale up effective programs that can reduce HIV transmission in the region, sustain investments in community-led HIV prevention programs, and influence more efficient HIV financing policies.

Health Equity Matters is a full member of the Australian Council for International Development (ACFID).

== Membership ==
Health Equity Matters' members are:

- the eight state and territory AIDS Councils, now known by various names;
- the National Association of People with HIV Australia (NAPWHA);
- the Australian Injecting and Illicit Drug Users League (AIVL);
- Anwernekenhe National HIV Alliance (ANA); and
- Scarlet Alliance, Australian Sex Workers Association.
