= Purdy =

Purdy may refer to:

== People ==
=== Surname ===
- Al Purdy (1918–2000), Canadian poet
- Amy Purdy (born 1979), American actress, model and Paralympic snowboarder
- Ashley Purdy, Black Veil Brides bassist
- Bill Purdy (born 1946), American rower
- Brock Purdy (born 1999), American football player
- Cecil Purdy (1906–1979), Australian chess player
- Charlie Purdy (1905–1982), New Zealand boxer
- Debbie Purdy (1963–2014), British music journalist, political activist and right-to-die patient
- Frederick Warren Purdy (1911–1942), US Navy World War II officer
- George B. Purdy, American mathematician and computer scientist
- Gordon Purdy (1888–1972), Canadian politician
- Hamish Purdy, Canadian art director and set decorator
- Helen Purdy Beale, born Helen Alice Purdy (1893–1976), US virologist
- Henry Purdy (cricketer) (1883–1943), English cricketer
- Henry Purdy (politician) (c. 1744–1827), landowner, judge and political figure in Nova Scotia
- Henry Purdy (rugby union) (born 1994), English rugby player
- James Purdy (1914–2009), American novelist, poet and playwright
- James E. Purdy (1858–1933), American photographer
- James Purdy (scholar), American scholar of writing and rhetoric
- Jedediah Purdy (born 1974), American legal scholar and cultural commentator
- Joe Purdy, American folk singer-songwriter
- John Purdy (chess player) (1935–2011), Australian chess champion
- John Purdy (cricketer) (1871–1938), English cricketer
- John Purdy (hydrographer) (1773–1843), English compiler of naval charts
- John Smith Purdy (1872–1936) public health expert and military physician associated with Australia
- Kate Purdy, American television writer and producer
- Ken Purdy (1913–1972), American automotive writer and editor
- Kym Purdy, Australian slalom canoeist
- Margaret Purdy (born 1995), Canadian pair ice skater
- G. Michael Purdy, British geophysicist and oceanographer
- Mike Purdy (1892–1950), American football player and coach
- Milton D. Purdy (1866–1937), American lawyer, US Attorney for Minnesota (1901–1902)
- Patrick Purdy (1964–1989), American perpetrator of the Stockton schoolyard shooting, killing five schoolchildren
- Pid Purdy (1904–1951), American baseball and football player
- Samuel Purdy (1819–1882), third Lieutenant Governor of California
- Steve Purdy (born 1985), American-born Salvadoran footballer
- Ted Purdy (born 1973), American golfer
- William Purdy (born 1940), Canadian politician

=== Given name ===
- Purdy Crawford (1931–2014), Canadian lawyer and businessman

== Places ==
=== In the United States ===
- Purdy, Kentucky, an unincorporated community
- Purdy Township, Barry County, Missouri
  - Purdy, Missouri, a city
- Purdy, Oklahoma, an unincorporated community
- Purdy, Tennessee, an unincorporated community
- Purdy, Virginia, an unincorporated community
- Purdy, Washington, an unincorporated community and census-designated place
- Purdy, West Virginia, an unincorporated community
- Purdy, Wisconsin, an unincorporated community

=== Elsewhere ===
- Purdy, a community in Hastings Highlands, Ontario, Canada
- Purdy Islands, Papua New Guinea

== Other uses ==
- USS Purdy, a US Navy destroyer that saw service in World War II
- Purdy's Chocolates, known as "Purdy's", Canadian chocolatier, confectionery manufacturer and retail operator

== See also ==
- Purdy's Wharf, Halifax, Nova Scotia, Canada
- Purdey (disambiguation)
- Purdie, surname
