= John Purdy =

John Purdy may refer to:

- John Purdy (chess player) (1935–2011), Australian chess champion
- John Purdy (cricketer) (1871–1938), English cricketer
- John Purdy (hydrographer) (1773–1843), English compiler of naval charts
- John Purdy (footballer) (born 1948), former Gaelic footballer
- John Smith Purdy (1872–1936), Scots-born physician in Australia
