= Bostin Loyd =

American bodybuilder

- Bostin Loyd c. 2020
- Born: Bostin Loyd; 29 March 1992; Los Angeles, California
- Died: 25 February 2022 (aged 29)
- Occupation: Bodybuilder
- Partner: Ariella Giavanna Palumbo
- Children: Jaxtin
- Mother: Marie Raia
- Website: www.bigdaddyb.com

Bostin Loyd (March 29, 1992 - February 25, 2022) was an American bodybuilder known for his controversial stance on steroid use in the bodybuilding industry.

He gained notoriety as one of the first competitive bodybuilders to publicly disclose his steroid regimen, which sparked both admiration and criticism within the bodybuilding community.

== Early life ==
Loyd grew up in California in a household where both his parents were bodybuilders. This environment heavily influenced his career path and lifestyle choices. At age 21, Loyd got a tattoo reading “Get big or die trying,” reflecting his commitment to bodybuilding.

== Health complications ==
Loyd had long experienced kidney issues and, in 2020, was diagnosed with Stage 5 kidney failure after self-administering a peptide known for causing weight loss in animal studies. Acknowledging the consequences of his actions, he stated on Facebook: “I did this to myself with an idiotic experiment, and it finally all caught up to me. Do I regret anything? Absolutely not.”

Following his diagnosis, Loyd struggled with anxiety and depression, particularly as his condition made future bodybuilding competitions unlikely. On February 25, 2022, he collapsed at home and died at the age of 29. A private autopsy determined that he died from a dissecting aneurysm of the ascending aorta. The examination also revealed a significantly thickened heart muscle, an enlarged liver, and kidney damage.
