= Purdey =

Purdey is a family name and may refer to:

- Purdey (The New Avengers), fictional character played by Joanna Lumley in the British TV series
- James Purdey and Sons, British gunmaker
- Mark Purdey (1953-2006), British organic farmer and anti-pesticide advocate
- Purdey's, soft drink produced by Orchid Drinks Ltd

== See also ==
- Purdie
- Purdy (disambiguation)
