= Acute aortic syndrome =

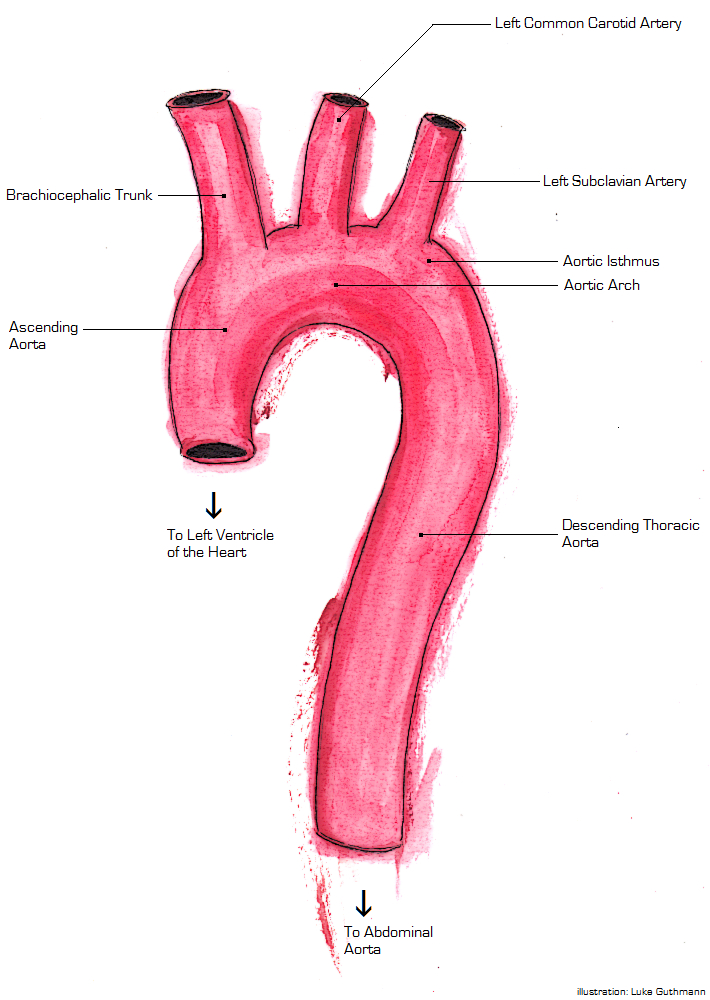
- Major aorta anatomy displaying ascending aorta, brachiocephalic trunk, left common carotid artery, left subclavian artery, aortic isthmus, aortic arch, and descending thoracic aorta
- Specialty: Vascular surgery

Acute aortic syndromes (AAS) are a range of severe, painful, potentially life-threatening abnormalities of the aorta. These include aortic dissection, intramural thrombus, and penetrating atherosclerotic aortic ulcer. AAS can be caused by a lesion on the wall of the aorta that involves the tunica media, often in the descending aorta. It is possible for AAS to lead to acute coronary syndrome. The term was introduced in 2001.

== Signs and symptoms ==
The most common symptom of AAS is sudden and severe chest pain. However, other variants of chest pain and back pain have been described.

== Causes ==
Causes can include aortic dissection (which is the most common type), intramural hematoma, penetrating atherosclerotic ulcer or a thoracic aneurysm that has become unstable. The potential causes of AAS are life-threatening and present with similar symptoms, making it difficult to distinguish the ultimate cause, though high resolution, high contrast computerised tomography can be used.

== Diagnosis ==
The condition can be mimicked by a ruptured cyst of the pericardium, ruptured aortic aneurysm and acute coronary syndrome.

Misdiagnosis is estimated at 39% and is associated with delays correct diagnosis and improper treatment with anticoagulants producing excessive bleeding and extended hospital stays.

== Management ==
AAS is life-threatening, with a high mortality rate if appearing acutely, reduced only when diagnosed early and treated by a surgeon with considerable expertise. If patients survive acute presentation, within three to five years 30% will develop complications and require close follow-up. Early diagnosis is essential for survival and management is challenging though greater awareness of the syndrome and improving management strategies are improving patient outcomes.
