= David R. Brown (neuroscientist) =

Australian neuroscientist

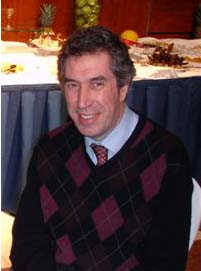
- David R. Brown
- Born: 7 September 1964 (age 61); Sydney, Australia
- Citizenship: British/Australian
- Education: University of Sydney (BSc, MSc, PhD)
- Known for: Research on prion diseases
- Scientific career
- Fields: Neuroscience
- Doctoral advisor: Max Bennett (scientist)

Professor David Ronald Brown (born 7 September 1964, Sydney, Australia) is an Australian-born research scientist notable for his work on prion diseases, which include bovine spongiform encephalopathy and vCJD. His most notable research relates to the metal binding of the protein central to these diseases, the prion protein, and its possible cellular role as an antioxidant.

Brown was a member of the Spongiform Encephalopathy Advisory Committee (SEAC), a British government advisory board on BSE and related diseases. Since then he has pursued research related to other neurodegenerative diseases.

== Career ==
Brown completed his studies at the University of Sydney at the age of 25 and gained the degrees B.Sc. M.Sc. and Ph.D. His doctoral studies were carried out in the Neurobiology Research Centre under Professor Max Bennett and involved research on nerve regeneration.

After completing his Ph.D. he worked for several more years in Australia before moving to the US in 1993 where he worked at the Albert Einstein College of Medicine. He moved to Germany and worked at the University of Göttingen where he first began work on the study of prion diseases in the Department of Neuropathology with Hans Kretzschmar. In 1997 he moved to the University of Cambridge and in 2001 to the University of Bath, where he is currently Professor of Biochemistry. He consults in this capacity with the media. He is the author of several textbooks and a number of research papers on prion diseases, and has served on the boards of four scientific journals, including the Journal of Neurochemistry.

== Prion research ==
Brown advanced research related to the role of metals in the cause of prion diseases such as vCJD. Media attention focused on this work when it became associated with that of the farmer Mark Purdey, who argued that human cases of vCJD might be caused by exposure to manganese rather than eating beef from BSE-infected cattle (the medical consensus). Both Purdey and Brown agreed that exposure to elevated levels of manganese in the environment could increase the incidence of BSE.

Brown's research showed that manganese causes the protein to change conformation, similar to that seen in prion diseases such as BSE. Additionally, his research also showed that animals with BSE and humans with vCJD had elevated levels of manganese in their brains, and that prion protein extracted from their brains retained some of this manganese. Brown agreed with Purdey only in as far as the potential for manganese to be a risk factor, increasing the likelihood that BSE or another prion disease would occur. Brown supported Purdey in his quest to investigate the potential role of manganese in prion disease and this led to the filming of a program for the BBC in which both Brown and Purdey appeared. While Purdey pursued the notion that environmental manganese was a cause of BSE (something that arguably could never be proven), Brown suggested that a chelation therapy to remove the excess manganese from patients with vCJD could be of benefit. While Brown's more conventional research was very well funded, such chelation therapy for prion disease was never funded despite support for the idea from a number of sources including Charles, Prince of Wales.

== Select bibliography ==
Books

- Brown, D. R. (2002) Prion Diseases and Copper Metabolism. Horwood Press, Chichester, UK. ISBN 1-898563-87-X.
- Brown D. R. (2005) Neurodegeneration and Prion Disease. Springer, USA. ISBN 0-387-23922-7.
- Kozlowski, H, Brown, D. R. and Valensin G. (2006) Metallochemistry of Neurodegeneration. Royal Society of Chemistry Publishing, UK. ISBN 0-85404-360-8.
- Brown, D. R. (2012) Brain Diseases and Metalloproteins, Pan Stanford Publishing, Singapore, ISBN 978-981-4316-01-9.

Articles

- See Research Profile for selected papers.
