= St John's Anglican Church, Darlinghurst =

St John's Anglican Church
- Church of St. John the Evangelist
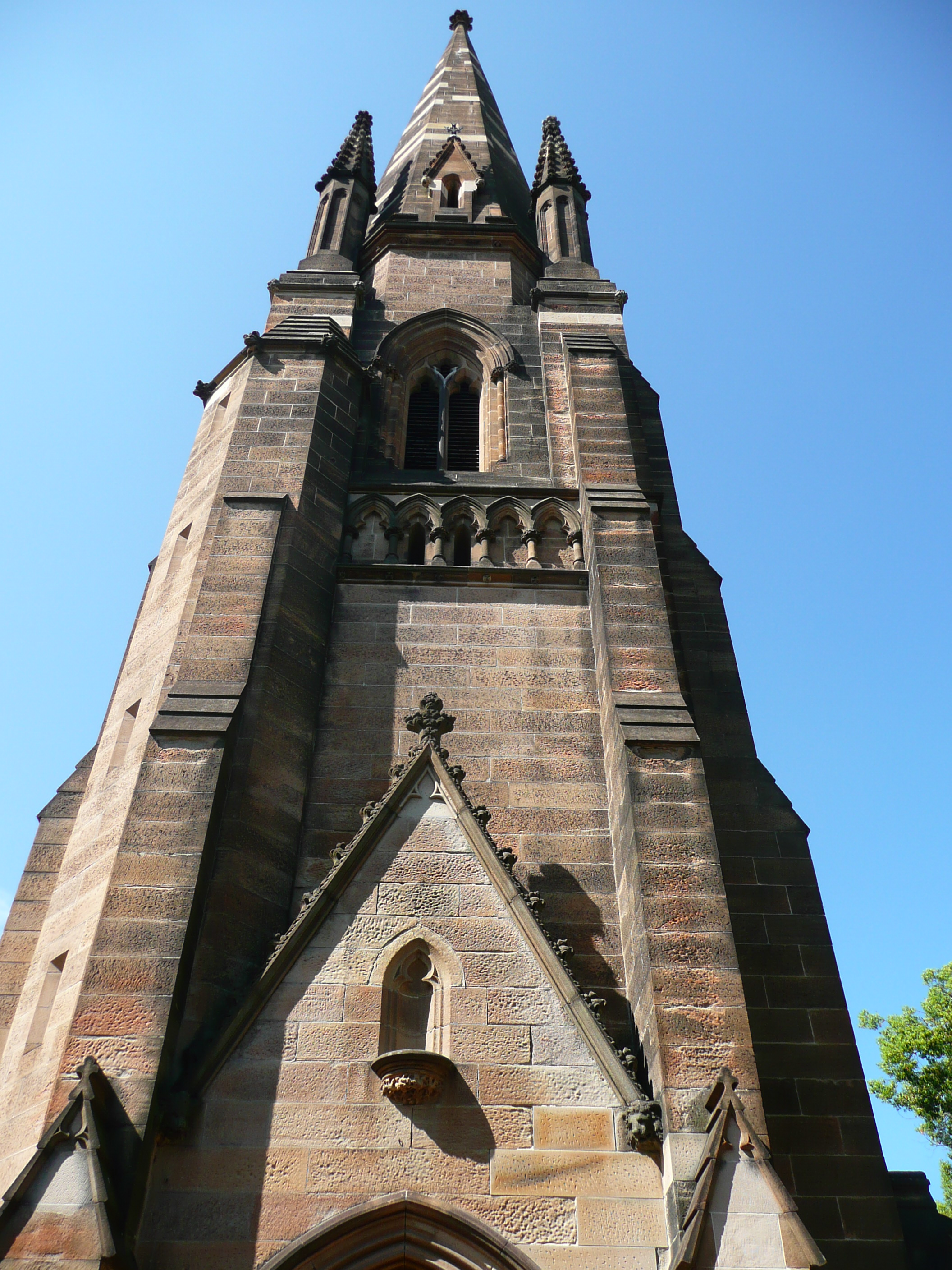

- Location in Greater Sydney
- 33°52′38″S 151°13′16″E
- Location: 120 Darlinghurst Road, Darlinghurst, Sydney, New South Wales
- Country: Australia
- Denomination: Anglican Church of Australia
- Website: stjohnsanglican.org.au

History
- Status: Church
- Founded: 1849
- Dedication: Saint John the Evangelist
- Consecrated: 1858

Architecture
- Functional status: Active
- Architects: Goold and Hilling (original design); Edmund Blacket (transepts and spire); Blacket Brothers (enlarged chancel and vestries)
- Architectural type: Gothic Revival
- Years built: 1856–1886

Administration
- Diocese: Sydney

Clergy
- Rector: Richard Glover

New South Wales Heritage Register
- Official name: St. John's Anglican Church & Rectory
- Type: Built
- Criteria: a., c., d., f., g.
- Designated: 2 April 1999
- Reference no.: 00461

The St John's Anglican Church, officially known as the Church of St. John the Evangelist, is a heritage-listed active Anglican church located at 120 Darlinghurst Road in the Sydney suburb of Darlinghurst, New South Wales, Australia. The church and its associated buildings were added to the New South Wales State Heritage Register on 2 April 1999. It was also listed on the former Register of the National Estate.

== History ==
The foundation stone for St John's Church was laid in December 1856, and the church opened in 1858. The initial building (stage 1), consisting of the nave, aisles and north porch, was designed by architectural firm Goold and Hilling. Allowances were made to add the chancel, tower and transepts at a later date. In 1871, a church benefactor described this initial building, while fine from the inside, "unsightly from the road and a discredit to the parish".

In 1871, Edmund Blacket commenced work on the ornate tower and spire, which is the major feature of the building. The transepts, tower and spire were added by 1875, and the chancel by 1875.

Because Blacket's additions are so prominent, St John's "now owes precious little of its outward appearance to Goold and Hilling" (Herman), though Blacket's design work is seen only in the large windows at the end of each transept, the tower and spire, the floor tiling and the reredos.

== Description ==
St John's is a large sandstone structure designed in the Gothic Revival style and built in the 19th century. It features a square tower, pinnacled spire, slate roof and dressed stonework.

The walls of the tower are of dressed ashalr in 12" courses, sparrow picked generally with tooled margins. The spire is of stone and has an early stone fleur-de-lis on top. A lightning conductor is mounted on top and runs down the east face of the spire.

The tower is independent of the original 1858 church on a separate 1872 foundation and consists of four storeys. The ground floor of the tower serves as a porch to the west entrance, the first floor is used for the bellringers, the second floor to keep noise of bells from the church and the ringers and for an inoperative clock, while the third floor is open to the air by four large windows.

The former rectory, located next to the church, is a two-storey building in the Italianate style. It was built c. 1867. As was common practice in the Victorian period, the building is composed predominantly of rendered brick. The rectory is state heritage-listed along with the church. It is now leased as an office.

The church was fortunate in its ministers, notable for their length of incumbency: Revs. Thos. Hayden, 1856–1882 (26 years); A. W. Pain, 1883–1902 (19 years); E. C. Beck, 1902–1923 (21 years) ; C. A. Lucas, 1924– ... John McKnight, 1984–1989, W. J. Lawton 1989–1999 ... Matthew Wilcoxen 2021–

== Social programs ==
- Anglicare: operates twice weekly to provide emergency relief
- Financial Counselling Service: available three days weekly
- Legal Counselling and Referral: available two days weekly
- Narcotics Anonymous: meets Tuesday and Thursday in the church hall
- Pastoral Care for Elderly or hospitalised: regular services provided for Elizabeth lodge and St Luke's
- Community Assistanced Program: operates from Rough Edges Coffee Shop to provide short-term or long-term emergency help

== Drop-in centre ==
In 1987, a drop-in centre called PJ's was opened by a St John's outreach worker and volunteers in St Peter's Church Hall, Darlinghurst. It operated consistently until 1994, when it had to close because St Peter's Church was closed down. The clergy from St John's searched for a place that was suitable for a new drop-in centre and decided to utilise the basement of the parish hall in Victoria Street. A new centre called Rough Edges was opened in 1996, fronting directly onto Victoria Street. It operated under full-time managers, supplemented by volunteers, until 2010; since then it has been staffed entirely by volunteers. It opens six nights of the week (Sunday to Friday from 7:30 to 9:00 pm). Drinks and food are given away for free after having been donated by Oz Harvest and other community groups such as St Mark's Darling Point, Govinda's and others.

== Heritage listing ==
The item is significant because it is part of one of the few unaltered Edmund Blacket buildings in Australia.

St John's Anglican Church, Darlinghurst was listed on the New South Wales State Heritage Register on 2 April 1999 having satisfied the following criteria.

The place is important in demonstrating the course, or pattern, of cultural or natural history in New South Wales.

St John's Church with its rectory, grounds and fence form the most intact 19th century group of church buildings in Sydney. The church building with its tower, spire, transepts and chancel is one of the few unaltered Edmund Blacket buildings in Australia and is the most richly executed Gothic Revival parish church in Australia.

The place is important in demonstrating aesthetic characteristics and/or a high degree of creative or technical achievement in New South Wales.

The tower and spire make a major contribution to the Darlinghurst streetscape, with the advantage of a prominent position

The place has a strong or special association with a particular community or cultural group in New South Wales for social, cultural or spiritual reasons.

The tower and spire dominate the surrounding buildings and mark a place of peace and refuge in Kings Cross. St John's reflects the growth and changes of the local community over the years.

The place possesses uncommon, rare or endangered aspects of the cultural or natural history of New South Wales.

It is one of the most intact 19th Century group of church buildings in Sydney, and one of the few unaltered Edmund Blacket buildings in Australia.

The place is important in demonstrating the principal characteristics of a class of cultural or natural places/environments in New South Wales.

St John's church is an excellent example of the English "medieval parish church" style built in Australia during the 19th Century.

== Notable people ==
- Emmeline M. D. Woolley (1843 – 18 March 1908), organist for ten years
- Vera Purdy (née Garnett; 1909–1940), prostitute and underworld figure, and Charlie Purdy (1905–1962), Australian and New Zealand boxer, were married at the church in January 1930

== Gallery ==
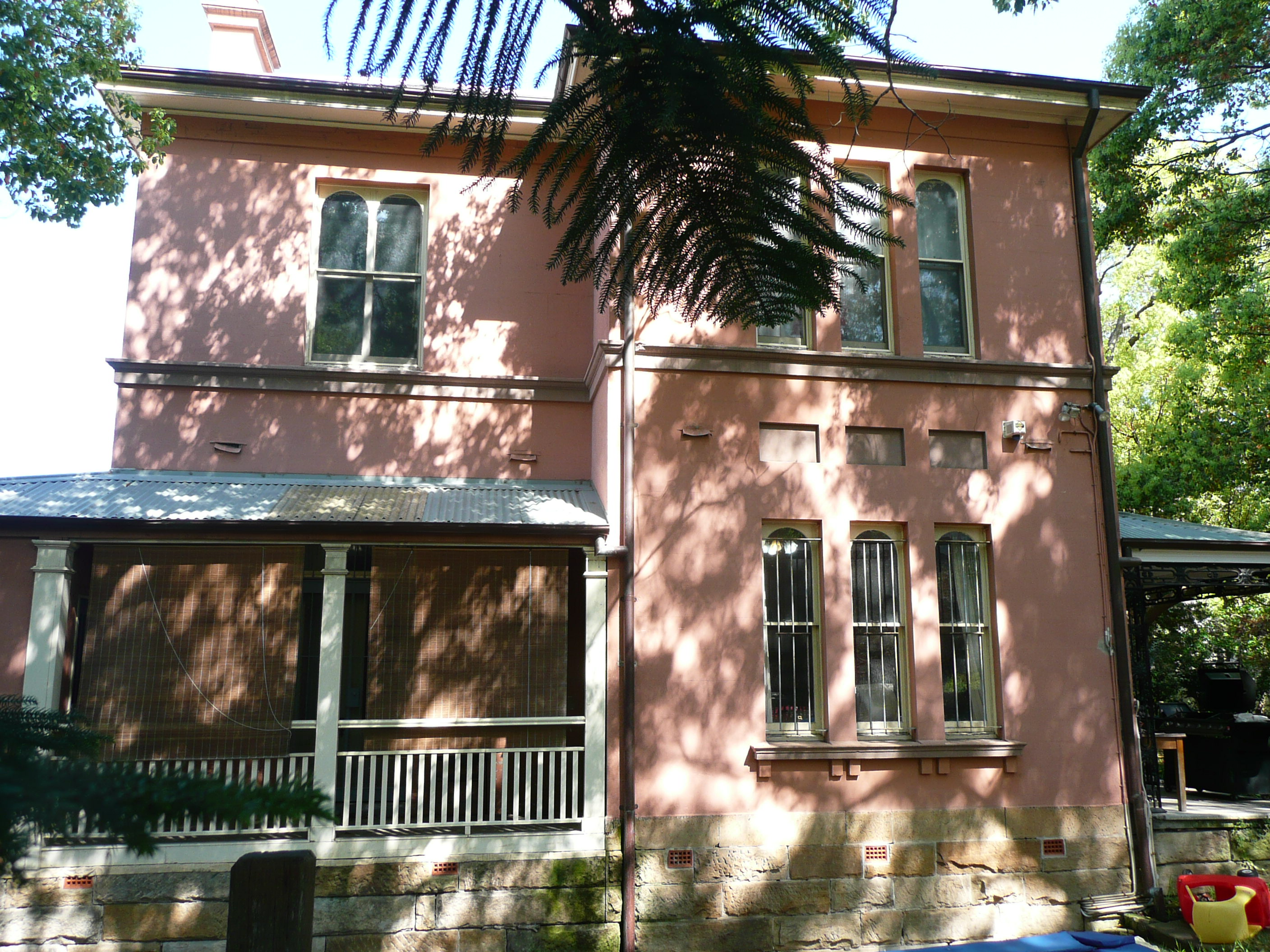
St John's Rectory

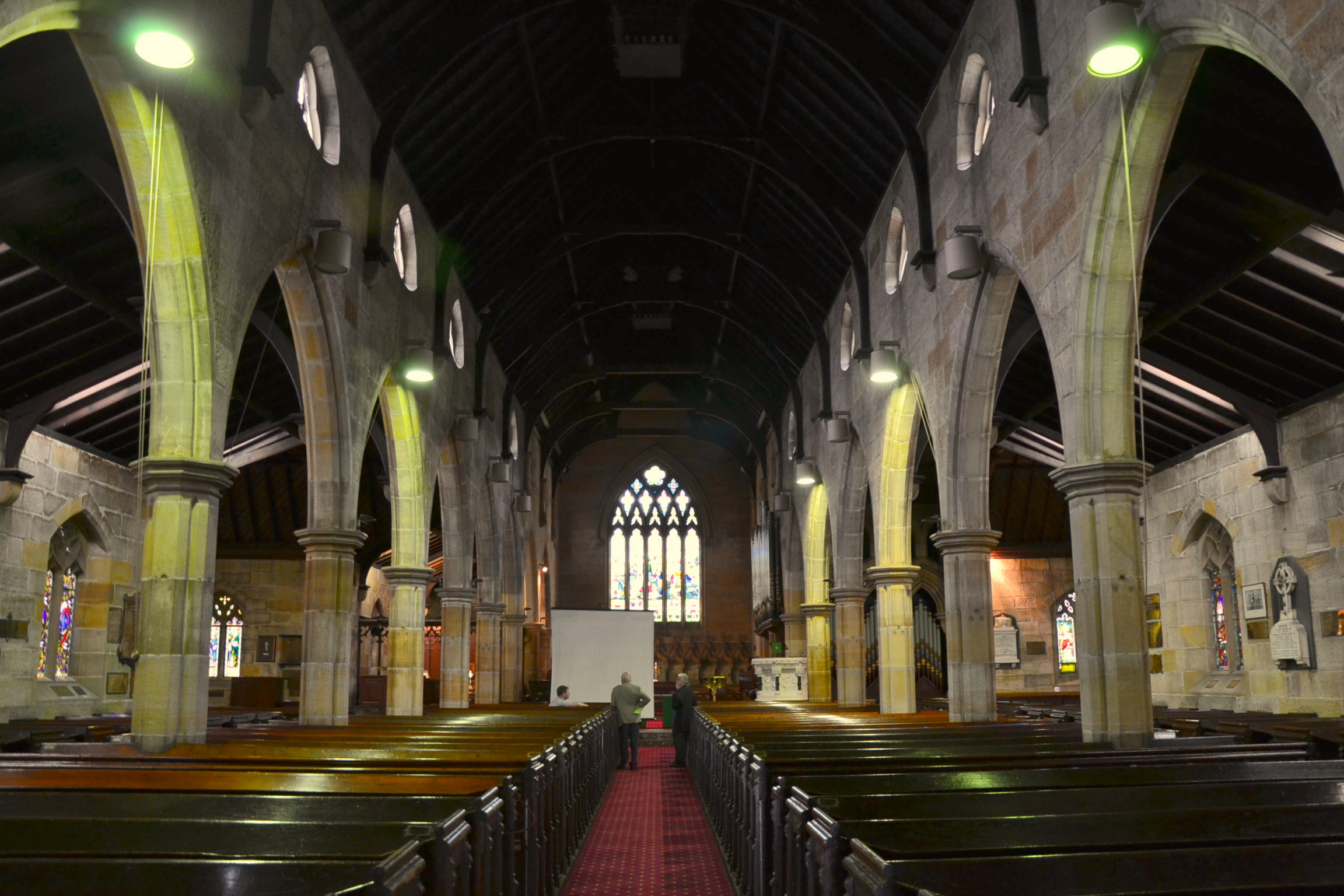
St John's, interior

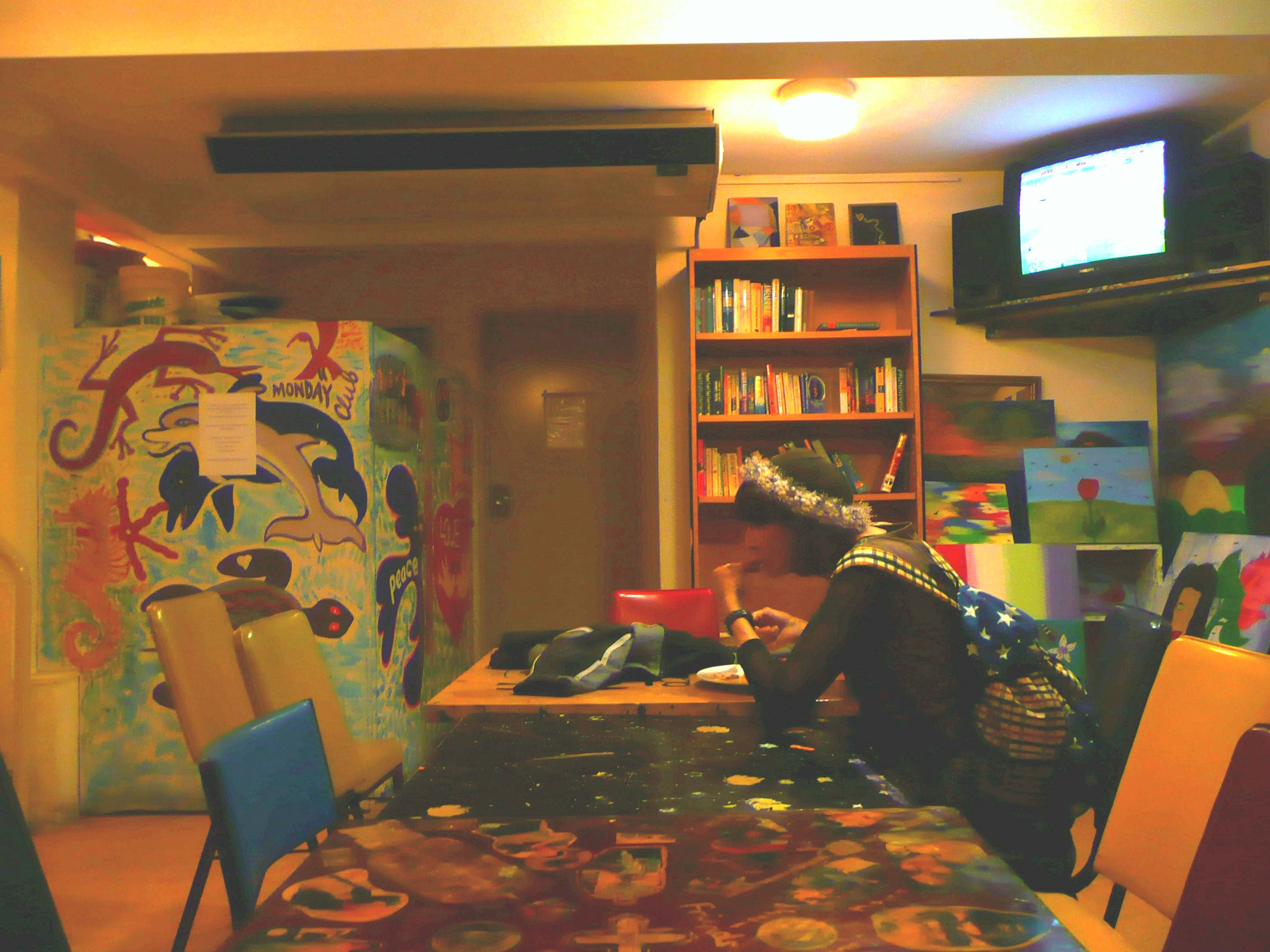
Rough Edges

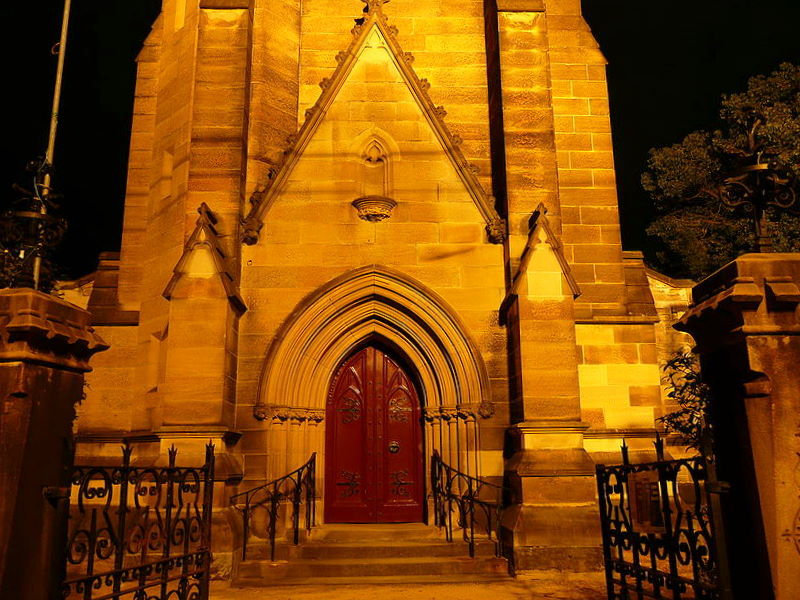
Main entrance of church

== See also ==
- Australian non-residential architectural styles
- List of Anglican churches in the Diocese of Sydney
