= Vera Purdy =

Australian gangster (1909–1940)

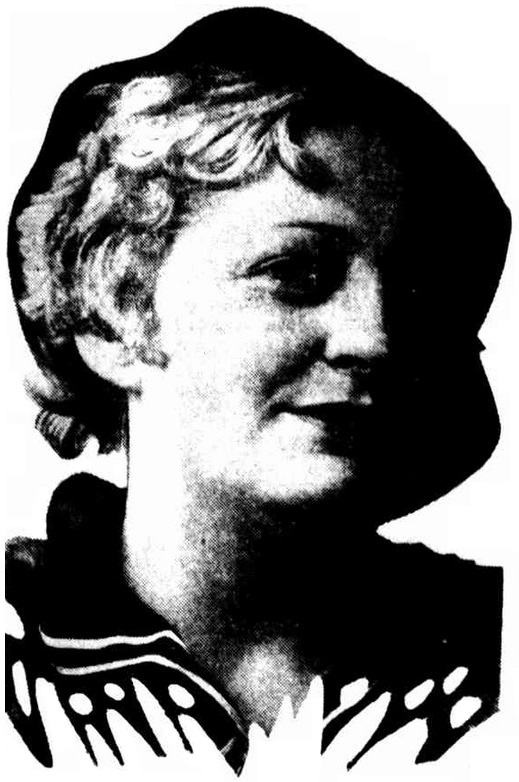
- Circa 1935
- Born: Hannah Vera Garnett; 20 January 1909; Christchurch, New Zealand
- Died: 21 December 1940 (aged 31); Toowoomba, Queensland, Australia
- Other names: Vera Barry; Vera Robinson; Bobbie Mason; Vera Mason; Fighting Queen of Sydney Underworld (nickname)
- Occupation(s): Prostitute, reputed thief
- Years active: c. 1930s
- Spouses: Charles Francis Purdy (m. 1930, div. 1935); Horace Clive Robinson (m. 1936, her death)

Vera Purdy (20 January 1909 – 21 December 1940) (other names included Vera Robinson) was an Australian prostitute and underworld figure. She was associated with reputed and convicted thieves, committed offences from Victoria to Queensland, and was a drug addict. Her obituary described her as 'volatile Vera Purdy, demi-mondaine, pickpocket, dope fiend, veritable she-cat, one of the most picturesque feminine figures to make her way through Australia's underworld'. Described as a 'tall, trim, peroxide blonde' died relatively young at 31.

Purdy, the 'Queen of Darlinghurst's 'night clubs'' was also referred to in 1940 after her death as the 'Fighting Queen of Sydney Underworld'. She was said to be 'the toughest, smartest, prettiest, most fashionable girl of the Sydney underworld. All the mob men, the razor men, the muscle men, the gun men, the cocaine men, the stand-over men; the dips, the safe-blowers and the urgers' liked her, yet feared her – and yet her reputation, like her life, did not survive as long as Tilly Devine (1900–1970) or Kate Leigh (1881–1964). A stylish dresser with expensive clothes, vermillion-sticked lips and pencilled eyebrows, with coiffured fair hair, Purdy's temper was well-known; at one stage when being arrested by a police officer and directed to drive to the police station, she kidnapped him.

== Early life ==
Purdy was born as Hannah Vera Garnett in 1909 in Christchurch, New Zealand, to parents Frederick John Garnett and Doris Ellen Garnett (née Woodward; c. 1882–1924), who had married on 28 December 1905. Her older sister and only sibling Doris Freda Garnett was born on 10 October 1906.

Her mother died on 26 July 1924 at 78 Salisbury Street, Christchurch when Purdy had just turned 15. A year later, aged 16, she was living in the Christchurch suburb of Halswell.

In July 1925, she appeared before the court as a witness to provide evidence of liquor served to underage persons at Munn's Occidental Hotel, Christchurch. 'Sweet sixteen, saucily attired' she 'minced forward' to the witness box, only later for the charges to be dismissed against the publican and the barman because she and Pearl Amelia Nicholls looked like quite mature and grown women. Instead Purdy was charged with being an idle and disorderly person, and committed to the Wellington Borstal Institute for a period not to exceed three years.

After serving fifteen months of a three-year vagrancy sentence, Purdy reportedly moved from Christchurch, New Zealand, to Australia. It was reported by 1937 Purdy was receiving a monthly remittance of £8 from her late father's estate in Nouméa.

== Criminal career ==
From these origins, Purdy's criminal life of adventure commenced, although she managed to avoid incarceration many times despite 'traffic offences, charges of stealing money, running into three figures, from men, and other varied clashes with the cops, brushing against her'. She admitted later in life 'she took the wrong turning and liked it', and that she 'only knew one way to make a living'; a 1925 New Zealand newspaper reported that her 'cool audacity' had 'won her an elevated place in the bad districts about King's Cross'.

Following an incident on 22 February 1930, at her business at Brougham Court, Brougham Street, King's Cross, Sydney, the now-'exceptionally smart and attractive wife of the well-known ex-New Zealand boxer, Charlie Purdy' had brought a charge against malicious damage against another. Purdy's sister Doris (now married to a Frank Farley) was present at the time. The magistrate quickly dismissed the prosecution as a case of a brawl.

On 14 April 1930 between 8 pm and 11 pm, her blue-and-fawn Essex sports model motor car, registered number plated as 217283, worth £365, had been stolen from Dowling Street, Paddington, Sydney. Recovered in August repainted, with parts removed, the mechanic and alleged thief was found not guilty having alleged he had been authorised by Purdy to take the car to a garage.

By May 1930, twice within the four months after obtaining her driving licence she faced the court on charges of dangerous driving; the latter occasion of speeding away after crashing into the centre of a tram on Abercrombe Street, Sydney. She was also convicted for the earlier incident at Kogarah on 15 April 1930.

February 1932 saw Purdy as the 'handsome young blonde', carrying her brown Pekingese dog under her arm, with 24-year-old unemployed tailor's cutter Robert Marsh who was attacked with a razor in the early hours of a Friday morning at Purdy's residence at Brougham Street, Darlinghurst, requiring 22 stitches. Despite admitting being present and a struggle with knives, the defendant Peter Costello was found not guilty by the jury in April, but found guilty of malicious wounding on 12 May 1932.

In May 1932, Purdy was to front the Sydney Court of Quarter Sessions on charges of assault with intent to rob, although she was found not guilty the next day. Ten days later, the 'toughest thing in skirts', the 'dashing, quick-witted girl-friend of razor slashers and dope addicts' had been charged with vagrancy, and was seeking to leave immediately to a 'quaint little one-horse town I've picked out somewhere up north'.

July 1933 saw Auld v Purdy played out in a New South Wales appeals court about section 4 of the Vagrancy Act 1902 (NSW), where whoever habitually consorts with known prostitutes commits an offence. It heard that Purdy was a known prostitute, had been in the company of other known prostitutes including Nellie Cameron, and shared a residence with one of those women.

In September 1933 now in Melbourne, aged about 29, she was associating with Leslie Thomas Faure (d. 1937) and his wife Irene. Irene's first husband Norman Bruhn (1894–1927) was a notorious and violent member of the criminal underworlds in both Melbourne and Sydney, and part of Australia's first 'razor gang'. Bruhn had been a pimp and one of the lovers of Nellie Cameron. After Bruhn's death and marrying Irene, Faure took care of Bruhn's two sons, where the Bruhn criminality continued through the generations albeit under the Faure surname.

A reputation for almost complete immunity from Melbourne juries, her modus operandi was to lure then rob male victims. In Sydney she was defended at least twice by well-known solicitor-to-the-underworld, Philip Norman Roach, who also later defended her second husband, Horace Robinson.

Her time in Queensland led to the Brisbane police knowing her as 'the blonde bombshell'. In May 1935 in Brisbane, in possession of stolen pound notes, she tried to start swallowing the evidence.

On 23 September 1936 in William Street, Sydney saw her with charges of theft and assault. Purdy offered to drive the complainant Clement Hill and Constable Thomas Small to the police station in her limousine, which was accepted; whereupon the 'beauteous blonde' then stated she was not going to the police station, and the group of them drove off. The 'kidnapped' police officer blew his whistle furiously for assistance, only to receive a back-hander across the mouth by Purdy, a scratch to the face, and told 'You — —, stop blowing that — whistle!'. After stopping to buy cigarettes in Palmer Street, she then drove to the Darlinghurst Police Station with the injured parties. The results were just convictions and fines.

January 1937 saw Purdy, who was living in Gore Street, Fitzroy, Melbourne, convicted on consorting, the habitual association with convicted offenders. Sentenced to three months imprisonment, a notice to appeal was lodged. The same charge two years prior had been successfully appealed; and this time she offered again a denial 'she had met any person for nefarious purposes'. The appeal was upheld and the conviction quashed.

The temperamental Purdy enjoyed driving her luxurious sedan motor car up and down Melbourne's Little Lonsdale Street, locating her male clients, and operating from a flat in La Trobe Street. By November 1937 she, as a Mrs Vera Barry, and known to the state's police vice squad, was back in the Melbourne Police Court, this time to appeal against the police commissioner being a 'moral censor' to deny her renewing her driver licence. It was not disputed she had several convictions including consorting and soliciting, the last being earlier in the year. It was raised the Commissioner had a discretionary power to refuse a licence when taking into account facts other than those disclosed in evidence; but was subject to a court of petty sessions: The court granted the application for a licence.

In 1938 Purdy ended up in a Melbourne hospital with tuberculosis, before making her way to New Zealand. Charged with stealing diamonds, she absconded back to Australia.

In October 1939, back in Sydney, the 29-year-old was charged with grievous bodily harm from an incident at the Vanderbilt Flats, King's Cross, after a woman went to retrieve her husband from that flat; but again Purdy was acquitted by the court.

By September 1940, Purdy was in Townsville, Queensland, living with a 'notorious criminal from the South', when she was pleaded guilty to fare evasion with a fine of £1 and to make restitution, and 'very insulting' language for a fine of £2.

From Townsville and Mackay she went to Toowoomba, only a few months before her demise.

== First marriage ==
Charles Francis Purdy (1905–1962), a former New Zealand professional welter boxer married Vera on 7 January 1930, he 24, she 21, at St John's Anglican Church, Darlinghurst, Sydney. It was reported on the wedding night, she flirted with another man, and threw a glass vase at her new husband when chided by him. Living on King's Cross Road, Darlinghurst, and several more addresses, coming home drunk early in the morning, she also used to assault him. By late July 1933, whilst still in love with her, he attended the Sydney Central Summons Court and sought the protection of the law after fearing his wife's threats: 'after remarking, "I'll put a bullet into you, Purdy!" had garnished her threat with a series of more or less inappropriate expletives'. For this she was bound over for twelve months to be of good behaviour.

After spending at least five occasions in a hospital from Vera's affrays, the couple drifted apart. A decree nisi was issued on 18 April 1935 following claims of constructive desertion by Charles.

== Second marriage ==
Horace Clive Robinson (1910–1982) was a motor mechanic at Kings Cross, Sydney, and married Purdy on 7 October 1936 in Sydney. In reality, Robinson engaged in a habitual criminal life of breaking, entering, and robbing. After moving to Melbourne, he last saw from her in July 1937 when he was gaoled until July 1940, and last heard from her in 1940.

== Death ==
After living at a Hursley Road residence, Toowoomba, Queensland, a 'one-horse town' as quipped by Purdy, she died at the Toowoomba General Hospital on Saturday, 21 December 1940, attributed to an overdose of cocaine. Cocaine hydrochloride was considered a dangerous drug at that time. The proprietress of the residence 'Sunnyside' had previous involvements with the police, including for sly grogging. After her death, a known criminal called at the police station for Purdy's belongings, stating he was her lawful husband, but disappeared when Robinson was located in New South Wales. Robinson advised he never knew Purdy was a drug addict, knew her occupation, or that she had been living in 'a house of ill-fame in Toowoomba'. There were no known children from any of her relationships.

== See also ==
- Razor gang
