= The King Edward VI School, Morpeth =

The King Edward VI School
- The school's current logo

Location
- Cottingwood Lane; Morpeth, Northumberland, NE61 1DN; England
- Coordinates: 55.1750°N 1.6930°W

Information
- Type: Academy
- Established: 1552; 474 years ago
- Local authority: Northumberland
- Department for Education URN: 137746 Tables
- Ofsted: Reports
- Chair of Board of Directors: Paul Carvin
- Headteacher: Clare Savage
- Gender: Mixed
- Age: 13 to 19
- Enrolment: 1414
- Houses: Collingwood, Davison, Hollon and Turner
- Specialisms: Arts and Technology
- Website: http://kevi.the3rivers.net/

King Edward VI School, Morpeth is a voluntary controlled academy high school in Morpeth, Northumberland, England. It was established by a royal charter as Morpeth Grammar School and later as King Edward VI Grammar School. The school became a comprehensive school in the 1970s and an academy in December 2011. It is locally known as "KEVI" or simply "King Edward's". In 2011, the school became part of The Three Rivers Learning Trust.

== History ==
The school was originally founded as a chantry school in the early 14th century and was located in the Morpeth Chantry. The school was refounded in 1552 as the Free Grammar School of King Edward the Sixth, being commonly referred to as the Morpeth Grammar School by locals. The reopening of the school is frequently associated with William Turner (c. 1508–1568), a nonconformist divine. He is known as the "Father of English Botany", was a native of Morpeth, and is believed to have attended the grammar school before attending Cambridge University and later to have returned to be its headmaster.

Morpeth Grammar School was the plaintiff in a lawsuit of the longest duration in English legal history. The case started in 1710 and concerned the recovery of lands granted to the school by Edward VI and later leased to the Thornton family. The case was reopened in 1833, advanced in 1847, and determined in 1870. By the 1940s the school was known as King Edward VI Grammar School.

The school lost its status as a grammar school in the educational reforms of the 1970s and became a comprehensive. A new school building was opened in 1967 to accommodate the boys' and girls' grammar schools, although they remained segregated until the new educational reforms took effect.

== Present day ==
The King Edward VI School was awarded Beacon School status in 2003, and Leading Edge status in 2004. The school officially gained academy status on 1 December 2011. The current building was constructed in 1967. The school was one of the first few schools to have two specialisms.

=== Management and local governance ===
The headteacher is Clare Savage.

The chair of the board of directors is Paul Carvin.

The school's local governing body is chaired by Linda Templey (May 2017 - May 2029), appointed by GB/board, and consists of nine governors.

=== Ofsted ===
As of 2020, the school's most recent Ofsted report was in 2014, when the school was judged as outstanding in all five categories.

=== Exam results ===
In 2016, Year 11 students achieved excellent GCSE results, the best in Northumberland. Eighty per cent of students achieved five or more passes at Grades A*–C, with 80 per cent gaining five or more including English and Maths, which was the highest percentage in Northumberland. Over 250 students from Year 11 have now moved into the 6th Form at King Edwards. In the same year, A Level students at the King Edward VI School produced excellent results. There was an increase in the percentage of A*–B grades to 53 per cent, an improvement of 5 per cent over the previous year. The overall A*–E pass rate increased to 99 per cent. The average points score per student came out at 838.9, which was the highest of any school in Northumberland.

=== Observatory ===
In 2014, students from the school's space club, KEVISA (KEVI Space Agency), designed and built an astronomical observatory on the school's former dry ski slope, securing funding from several sources. Housing an 11-inch telescope, the observatory is used for enrichment activities involving students, and events throughout the year where members of the public can learn about astronomy.

=== Music department ===
The school music department hosts many music clubs, including three choirs, a jazz band, steel band, ceilidh band and full community orchestra formed of students, parents and other local musicians. The department also produces biennial school musicals.

=== Year 9 commemoration service ===
The school stands at the top of Cottingwood Lane and, in a long-standing tradition, all Year 9 students take part in a commemoration service in St James's Church which sits at the bottom of the lane. It is intended to give students a short history of the school and introduce them to the school's values and ideals. The service consists of a number of short readings from staff and students, accompanied by songs from the school choir.

== School arms ==
The school arms are: Argent masoned gules, a tower triple-turreted within a bordure of the second charged with eight martlets of the first.

== Notable former pupils ==
- William Turner (naturalist) (c.1508–1568), English physician, theologian, and naturalist, recognized as the "father of English botany"
- John Urpeth Rastrick (1780–1856), English civil engineer and steam locomotive pioneer, co-builder of the Stourbridge Lion and designer of the Ouse Valley Viaduct
- John Smith Purdy (1872–1936), soldier and physician
- Alan Raitt (1930–2006), Professor of French Literature at the University of Oxford
- Sid Waddell (1940–2012), darts commentator
- Bill Rutherford (1955– ), British biochemist and Fellow of the Royal Society
- Alex Banfield (1990– ), concert and operatic tenor
- Hannah Kaner (1992/1993–), fantasy novelist
- Jack Clark (1994– ), cricketer
- Daniel Dixon (2002– ), triathlete (Commonwealth Games competitor).
- James McConnell (footballer, born 2004) (2004– ), footballer

== Sources ==
- The King Edward VI School website
- DES website: The King Edward VI School, Morpeth
- Schoolsfinder Direct (UK Government) website: school profile 2006
- BBC: Secondary schools league tables: The King Edward VI School, Morpeth
- Morpeth Chantry Conservation Management Plan(includes historical detail on the buildings and the school)
- Morpeth Bagpipe Museum: Chantry building
- KEVI Steel Pans Website
