= Bill Rutherford =

British biochemist

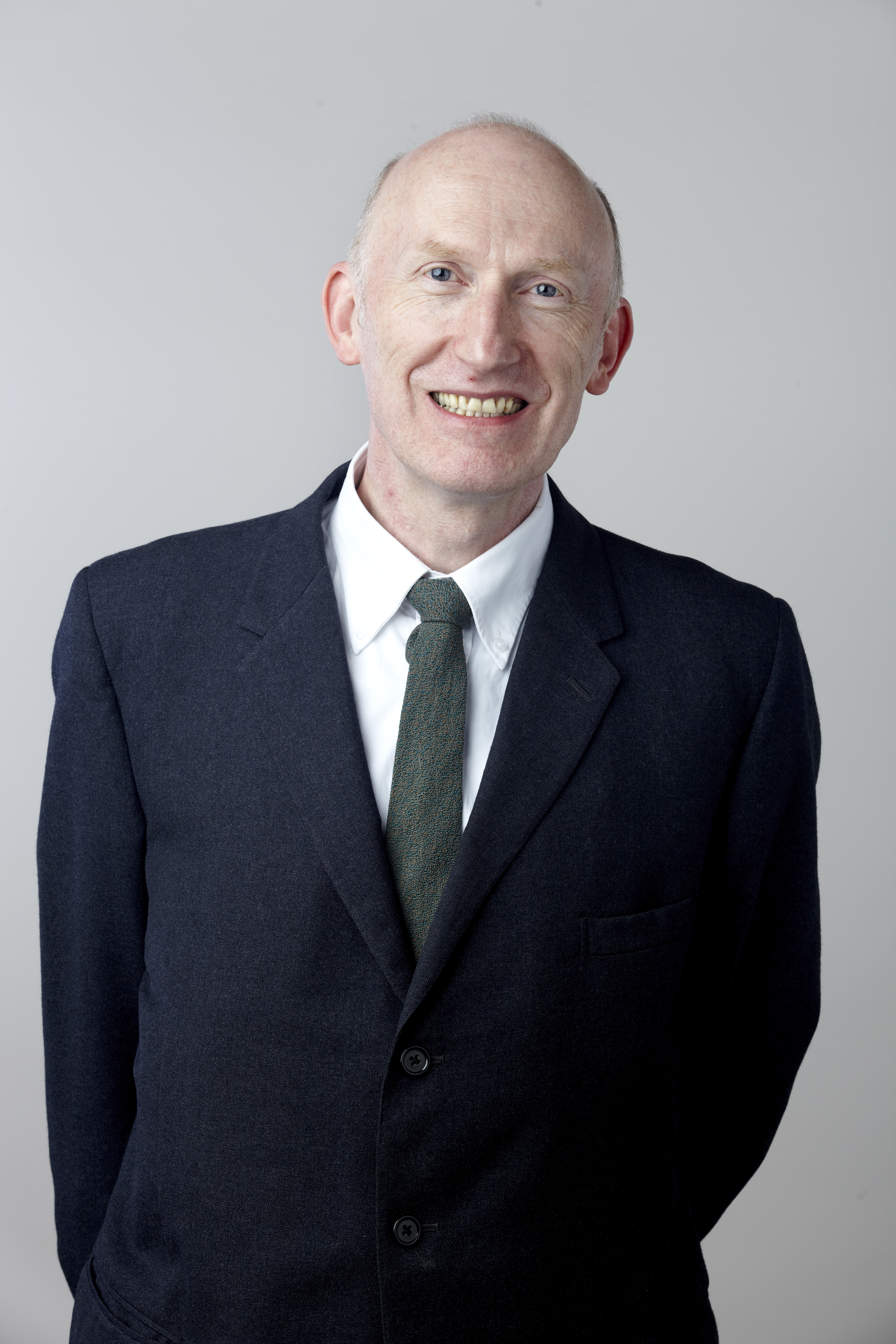
- Bill Rutherford in at the Royal Society admissions day in London, July 2014
- Born: Alfred William Rutherford; 2 January 1955 (age 71); Morpeth, Northumberland
- Education: University of Liverpool (BSc); University College London (PhD)
- Awards: FRS (2014); Wolfson Merit Award (2011); Médaille d'argent du CNRS (2001); EMBO Member (2001)
- Scientific career
- Fields: Photodissociation; Photosystem II; Nitrogen fixation
- Workplaces: Imperial College London; University of Illinois at Urbana–Champaign
- Thesis: Electron paramagnetic resonance studies of photosynthetic electron transport in purple bacteria (1979)
- Doctoral advisor: Michael C.W. Evans
- Website: imperial.ac.uk/people/a.rutherford

Alfred William Rutherford FRS is Professor and Chair in Biochemistry of Solar energy in the Department of Life sciences at Imperial College London.

== Education ==
Rutherford was educated at King Edward VI Grammar School for Boys, Morpeth and the University of Liverpool where he was awarded a Bachelor of Science degree in Biochemistry in 1976. He moved to University College London (UCL) where he was awarded a PhD in 1979 for electron paramagnetic resonance studies of photosynthetic electron transport in purple bacteria supervised by Michael C.W. Evans.

== Research ==
Rutherford's research investigates:

the water oxidising enzyme Photosystem II in terms of its mechanism, its assembly and its evolutionary relationships with other photosynthetic reaction centres. This enzyme has become the focus of attention because cheap water splitting catalysts are urgently needed in the energy sector for solar fuel production, electrolysis of water and the reverse reaction in fuel cells. My research has made major contributions to understanding this enzyme before it was either popular or profitable. Now that it is finally becoming both of those, I hope to continue to do more of the same. Not just because it might contribute to solving aspects of the energy crisis but also because understanding the enzyme, which put the energy into the biosphere, the oxygen into the atmosphere and thence changed the planet, is one of the greatest challenges in biology and chemistry. It is also a fun enzyme to work on.

Rutherford's research has been funded by the Biotechnology and Biological Sciences Research Council (BBSRC), the Wolfson Foundation and the Royal Society.

== Awards and honours ==
Rutherford was elected a Fellow of the Royal Society (FRS) in 2014. His nomination reads:

Bill Rutherford has made seminal contributions that provided deep insights into the structure and function of photosynthetic reaction centres, in particular Photosystem II (PSII). He was the first to propose that PSII had the same basic structure as the simpler, non-oxygenic purple bacterial reaction centre. This key conceptual change became accepted thanks to his important experimental contributions. He went on to discover key features of PSII that differentiate it from other reaction centres. The current understanding of PSII owes a great deal to his incisive experiments and thinking.

Rutherford has also been awarded the Royal Society Wolfson Research Merit Award, the Médaille d'argent of the Centre National de la Recherche Scientifique (CNRS) in 2001 and was elected a member of the European Molecular Biology Organization (EMBO) in 2001. On 25 January 2013 Rutherford received an honorary doctorate from the Faculty of Science and Technology at Uppsala University, Sweden.

== Personal life ==
Rutherford is a musician and has been a member of The Baskervilles Blues Band and Baskerville Willy.
