= Spencer Crakanthorp =

Australian chess player (1885–1936)

Spencer Crakanthorp (17 February 1885 in Sydney, Australia – 1 August 1936) was a chess player and Australian Chess Champion in 1923−24, 1925−26, 1926 and 1927. He was the father-in-law of chess master Cecil Purdy who married Anne Purdy (née Crakanthorp, 1915–2013). Anne was a strong A Grade chess player in her own right. He was also grandfather to another chess master, Cecil's son John Purdy. Furthermore, Crakanthorp's granddaughter Diana Hutchings (née Purdy) married Frank Hutchings — winner of the 1953 New Zealand junior chess championship while his father (Lawrence Crakanthorp) (1857–1929) was ranked world no 188 in the 1902 historical world rating list. Therefore, the Crakanthorp–Purdy family can be recognized as one of the greatest chess dynasties ever.
