= Jack Clark (cricketer) =

English cricketer

Personal information
- Full name: Jack Clark
- Born: 26 September 1994 (age 32); Ashington, Northumberland, England
- Batting: Left-handed
- Bowling: Left-arm medium

Domestic team information
- Years: Team
- 2013–2015: Northumberland
- 2016–2017: Durham MCCU

Career statistics
| Competition | First-class |
|---|---|
| Matches | 4 |
| Runs scored | 76 |
| Batting average | 12.66 |
| 100s/50s | –/– |
| Top score | 32 |
| Catches/stumpings | 3/– |
- Source: Cricinfo, 14 June 2019

Jack Clark (born 26 September 1994) is an English former first-class cricketer.

Clark was born at Ashington and educated at The King Edward VI School, Morpeth. From there he attended the Durham University School of Engineering and Computing Sciences. Clark debuted in minor counties cricket for Northumberland in the 2013 MCCA Knockout Trophy. He played minor counties cricket for Northumberland until 2015, making four appearances each in the Minor Counties Championship and the MCCA Knockout Trophy. While studying at Durham University, Clark played first-class cricket for Durham MCCU, debuting against Gloucestershire at Bristol. Clark played first-class cricket for Durham MCCU until 2017, making four appearances. He scored 76 runs in these matches, with a high score of 32.
