= Isolated superior mesenteric artery dissection =

- Other names: ISMAD
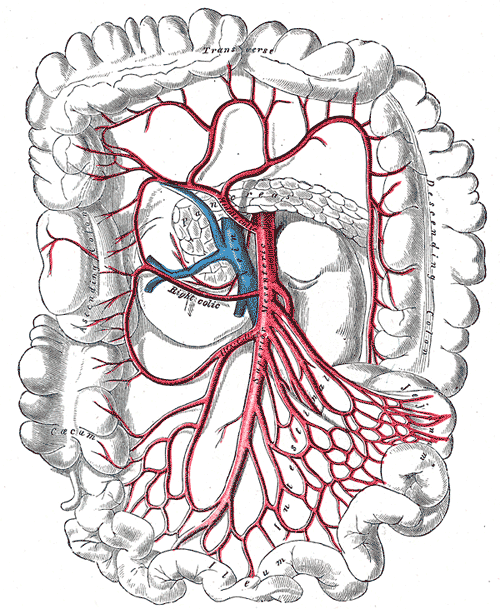
- Frontal view of the superior mesenteric artery and its branches.
- Specialty: Vascular surgery, cardiothoracic surgery

Isolated superior mesenteric artery dissection (ISMAD) is a rare but potentially life-threatening condition that causes acute abdominal pain. It refers to a dissection that occurs solely in the superior mesenteric artery (SMA), typically spontaneously, and does not involve the aorta. Although aortic dissection can frequently extend into its peripheral territories, it is rare for these branches to have dissection without main aortic trunk involvement. The SMA is the most common site of dissection among visceral arteries compared to other gastrointestinal arteries.

== Signs and symptoms ==
ISMAD primarily manifests through a sudden onset of pain, which can vary in location and intensity. The nature of the pain and its location can provide clues to the diagnosis of ISMAD. The types of pain reported in ISMAD cases include:

- Abdominal pain: This is the most common symptom, reported in 55.8% of cases. The pain can be sharp, dull, constant, or intermittent.
- Epigastric pain: This pain is experienced by 22.7% of patients, in the upper middle of the abdomen, just below the ribs.
- Periumbilical pain: This type of pain, reported in 4.8% of cases, is centered around the navel or belly button.
- Back pain: Also reported in 4.8% of cases, this pain can range from a dull ache to a sharp, intense pain.
- Chest pain: This is a less common symptom, reported in 2.0% of cases. It's important to differentiate this from chest pain caused by cardiac conditions.

ISMAD is more common in males, accounting for 80.6% of cases, and typically occurs in individuals in their fifth decade of life, with a mean age of 55.7 years. Other risk factors include smoking and hypertension.

== Cause ==
ISMAD can be associated with isolated arterial dissections and aneurysms, such as those in the celiac and renal arteries, suggesting a systemic component. It has been linked to certain vascular diseases like fibromuscular dysplasia, medial degeneration, and atherosclerosis.

The structure of the SMA itself can contribute to ISMAD. Certain anatomical variants are more susceptible to shear stress, leading to dissection. This stress occurs when the SMA, lacking mechanical support from the pancreas, bends within the mesenteric root. The anterior wall, the most common site of ISMAD, faces increased stress due to the SMA's convexity after bending.

Genetics also plays a role in ISMAD. It has been hypothesized that a genetic component exists, as most reported cases are from East Asia. This hypothesis is supported by a familial case of ISMAD from China linked to a chromosomal locus of 5q13–14.

== Diagnosis ==
In terms of the diagnosis of ISMAD, the following is done:

- Angiography
- Ultrasonography
- CT scan

== Management ==
The management of isolated superior mesenteric artery dissection (ISMAD) often involves conservative treatment, which includes blood pressure lowering therapy, analgesics, and initial bowel rest. Periodic follow-ups with CT angiography are a part of the conservative treatment approach. Over time, many patients show improvement or no change in their condition as observed through these follow-ups. A small percentage of patients reported mild abdominal discomfort during the follow-up period, but no patient developed recurrent abdominal pain following conservative treatment. Importantly, there was no mortality related to SISMAD. These observations suggest that conservative treatment can be an effective approach for managing patients with SISMAD.

In cases where conservative treatment is not sufficient, endovascular procedures may be considered. These include stenting/stent-grafting of the true lumen, (coil) embolization of the false lumen/aneurysm, catheter-directed local thrombolysis, percutaneous transluminal angioplasty, and catheter-directed local papaverine infusion at 30 mg/h.

In related surgical procedures such as Minimally Invasive Pancreaticoduodenectomy (MIPD), various approaches for dissection around the SMA have been reported, including anterior, posterior, right, and left approaches.While these methods are not specifically used for ISMAD, understanding these surgical techniques could potentially inform future treatment strategies for ISMAD.

== Prognosis ==
The prognosis for patients with ISMAD who undergo conservative treatment is generally positive. Follow-up studies show that the majority of patients either improve or do not show progression of the condition. This is evidenced by CT angiograms, which often show a decrease in the size of the false lumen, a decrease in the length of the dissection, or complete remodeling of the dissection.

During the follow-up period, some patients reported mild, nonspecific abdominal discomfort. However, no patient developed recurrent abdominal pain following conservative treatment, and there was no mortality related to ISMAD. These findings further support the effectiveness of conservative treatment for managing patients with ISMAD.

In cases where conservative treatment is not sufficient, endovascular procedures may be considered. These include stenting/stent-grafting of the true lumen, (coil) embolization of the false lumen/aneurysm, catheter-directed local thrombolysis, percutaneous transluminal angioplasty, and catheter-directed local papaverine infusion at 30 mg/h.
