= Purdie =

Purdie is a surname and may refer to:

- Alexander Purdie, Colonial Williamsburg printer, publisher, merchant
- Alexander Callender Purdie (1824–1899), New Zealand naturalist
- Bernard Purdie (born 1939), American session drummer
- Bernard Purdie (footballer) (born 1949), Welsh footballer
- Brad Purdie (born 1972), Canadian ice hockey player
- Dan Purdie (born 1973), Australian politician
- Deshawn Purdie (born 2006), American football player
- Ethel Ayres Purdie (1874 - 1923), British accountant and suffragist
- Henry Augustus Purdie (1840–1911), American naturalist
- Jock Purdie (1918–1988), English footballer
- Justin Purdie (born 1980), Samoan rugby union player
- Rob Purdie (born 1982), English footballer
- Tom Purdie (1854–1929), Scottish footballer who played for Hearts
- Russell Purdie (born 1967), American intern under Pat Buchanan American conservative columnist and Communications Director for USA President Ronald Reagan.

== See also ==
- Purdey (disambiguation)
- Purdy (disambiguation)
