= Penetrating atherosclerotic ulcer =

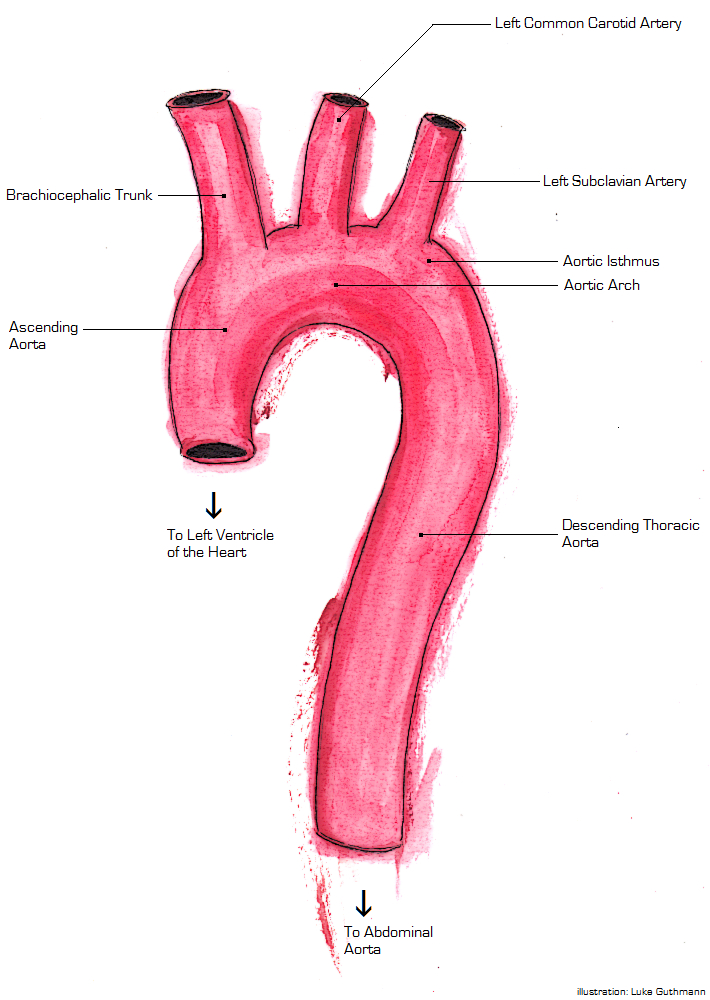
- Aorta Anatomy
- Specialty: Cardiology
- Causes: Atherosclerosis
- Diagnostic method: MRI

A penetrating atherosclerotic ulcer (PAU) is an atherosclerotic lesion that ulcerates, leading to a hematoma forming within the walls of the aorta.

== Diagnosis ==
The condition is often associated with thickening of the aortic wall, and can be differentiated from similar conditions (atherosclerotic plaque and a thrombus) through the use of computed tomography and magnetic resonance imaging, though the latter is superior. Transesophageal echocardiography and intravascular ultrasonography may also be used in differentiation.

== Treatment ==
Complications such as rupture or other life-threatening conditions are rare. Treatment may involve surgery, particularly when signs indicating worsening are present (the patient is unable to control their pain or changes in blood pressure).
