= John Purdy (footballer) =

Irish Gaelic footballer

Personal information
- Born: Tullylish, County Down
- Occupation: Veterinarian

Sport
- Sport: Gaelic football
- Position: Left corner-forward
Club
- Years: Club
- 1960s-1980s: Lawrencetown
Inter-county
- Years: County
- 1960s-1970s: Down
Inter-county titles
- Ulster titles: 3
- All-Irelands: 1
- NFL: 1
- All Stars: 0

John Purdy (born 1948 in Tullylish, County Down) is a former Irish sportsman. He played Gaelic football with his local club Lawrencetown and was a member of the Down senior inter-county team from the 1960s until the 1970s, winning an All-Ireland medal in 1968.
