= Cecil Purdy =

Australian chess player and writer (1906–1979)

C. J. S. Purdy

Personal information
- Full name: Cecil John Seddon Purdy
- Born: 27 March 1906 Port Said, Egypt
- Died: 6 November 1979 (aged 73) Sydney, Australia

Chess career
- Country: Australia
- Title: International Master (1951); ICCF Grandmaster (1959)
- ICCF World Champion: 1950–53

C.J.S. (Cecil John Seddon) Purdy AM (27 March 1906 – 6 November 1979) was an Australian chess player and writer. He was awarded the International Master title in 1951 and the Grandmaster of Correspondence Chess title in 1959. Purdy was the first world correspondence chess champion. He was also an influential chess magazine writer, editor, and publisher.

== Early life ==
Purdy was born in Port Said, Egypt, where his father John Smith Purdy was stationed as a doctor in the Quarantine Service. When he was a child, Purdy moved with his family to New Zealand, and then to Tasmania, Australia, before they settled in Sydney when he was 12. He was educated at Cranbrook School. While in Tasmania, one of his classmates was future film star Errol Flynn.

== Career ==
Purdy began his chess career at age 16. He soon decided to become a full-time chess writer and player. Initially an over-the-board (OTB) player, he soon began to mix OTB play with correspondence play. He was a four-time winner of the Australian Chess Championship, in 1935, 1937, 1949, and 1951. He also won the New Zealand Chess Championship in 1924/25. In Auckland in 1952, Purdy drew a hard-fought match with Ortvin Sarapu, at the time by far the best player in New Zealand. They were thus declared Australasian co-champions.

Purdy won the first two Australian Correspondence Chess Championships, in 1938 and 1945; and the inaugural World Correspondence Chess Championship in 1953.

Purdy founded and edited the magazine Australasian Chess Review (1929–1944), which became Check (1944–45), and finally Chess World (1946–1967). He was described by Bobby Fischer as being a great chess instructor. Some of his writings are still in print. A famous remark of his is "Pawn endings are to chess what putting is to golf."

In 1976 he was awarded the Order of Australia for services to chess.

== Personal life ==
He was married in 1934 to Anne Crakanthorp (1915–2013), the daughter of two-time Australian Chess Champion Spencer Crakanthorp. The marriage produced two children, John (1935–2011) and Diana. John Purdy followed in his father's (and grandfather's) footsteps in winning the Australian Chess Championship in 1955 and 1963. Diana, also a chess player, married leading New Zealand player Frank Hutchings in 1960.

=== Death ===
On 6 November 1979, Purdy collapsed while playing chess at a tournament at the Chess Centre of New South Wales and died later that day in the Sydney Hospital. He was survived by his wife, daughter and son John, who twice won the Australian Chess Championship.

== Published works ==
- Purdy, C.J.S. (1950). Guide To Good Chess. Horwitz.
- Purdy, C.J.S. (1972). How Fischer Won: World Chess Championship, 1972. E. J. Dwyer. ISBN 978-0855742089.
- Purdy, C.J.S. (1992). Tykodi, Ralph J. (ed.). C.J.S. Purdy's Fine Art of Chess Annotation and Other Thoughts. Thinkers' Press.
- Purdy, C.J.S. (2003). C.J.S. Purdy on the Endgame. Thinker's Press. ISBN 1-888710-03-9. A collection of articles from his chess publications.

Preceded by none	World Correspondence Chess Champion; 1950–1953	Succeeded by (Soviet Union) Viacheslav Ragozin
