= John Purdy (chess player) =

Australian chess player and judge (1935–2011)

Chess career
- Country: Australia
- Title: Australian Master
- FIDE rating: 2143

John Purdy

Judge, Family Court of Australia
- In office 1984 – 25 September 2005

Personal details
- Born: John Spencer Purdy; 25 September 1935 Sydney, Australia
- Died: 27 August 2011 (aged 75) Taree, Australia
- Resting place: North Ryde
- Citizenship: Australian
- Relations: C J S Purdy (father), Spencer Crakanthorp (maternal grandfather)
- Education: North Sydney Boys High, The University of Sydney Law Extension Committee
- Profession: Accountant, barrister, administrator, judge

John Purdy (25 September 1935 – 27 August 2011) was an Australian chess player and Family Court judge.

== Early life ==
John Spencer Purdy was born on 25 September 1935 in Sydney, New South Wales. His father was C J S Purdy, an Australian chess International Master, inaugural World Correspondence Chess champion, and "one of the world's greatest English-language chess writers and teachers". His mother was Anne (née Crakanthorp, 1915–2013) and who held the lease of Greenwich Baths on Sydney Harbour. His maternal grandfather, Spencer Crakanthorp, was twice Australian chess champion and Spencer's father, Lawrence, had been a leading Australian player. Thus, John started to play chess at a very young age.

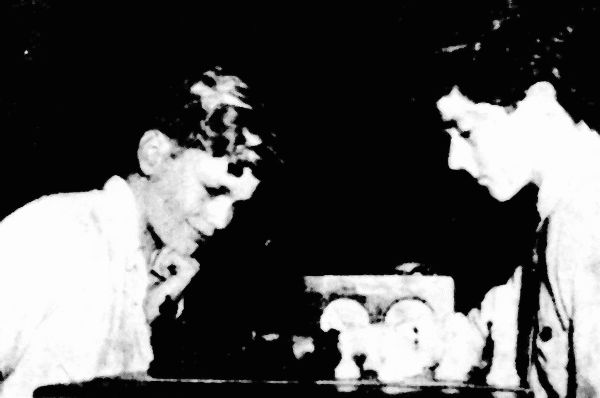
1951 Australian Junior Chess Champion John Purdy (left) and his rival, John Bailey

John attended North Sydney Boys High where his friends encourage him to take up chess competitively at the age of 13. Less than two years later, in 1951, he was the Australian Junior Chess Champion. Purdy won the title in the last round with 9½ points when John Bailey, the NSW Junior Champion could only manage a draw to finish on 9 points.

== Chess master ==
In 1955 he became the youngest person to win the Australian Chess Championship. However, that year he failed to qualify for the junior world chess championship finals in Antwerp (the title was won by Boris Spassky). He represented Australia in the British Chess Championship in 1955.

He won the Australian title for a second time in 1963. That year, he represented Australia in the Asian Zonal championship in Jakarta (won by Béla Berger). Also in 1963, he won the first Doeberl Cup in Canberra.

Purdy served as president of the Australian Chess Federation in 1971–72.

In 2003, Purdy suffered an aortic dissection in Lismore and spent weeks at St Vincent's Hospital, Sydney. Although rehabilitation allowed him to return to his professional life, he was unable to continue playing chess. His latterday interests became golf, swimming, reading and bridge.

== Accountant then barrister ==
Purdy qualified as an accountant and then worked for the Printing and Allied Trades Employers' Association from 1956 to 1973.

He qualified through the Barristers' Admission Board for the New South Wales Bar where he practised for five years before leaving to work for the Law Society of New South Wales in 1978. He became chief executive officer in 1980.

== Judge, Family Court of Australia ==
In 1984, Purdy was appointment to the Family Court of Australia. Headquartered at Parramatta, he also travelled on circuit throughout Australia. He retired in 2005 on reaching statutory retirement age.

== Family life ==
Purdy married Felicity Stapleton on 6 December 1958.

== Death ==
Purdy died at Taree while travelling to attend a funeral at Kempsey. His funeral was held on 9 September 2011 at the Camellia Chapel, Macquarie Park Cemetery and Crematorium, corner of Delhi and Plassey Roads North Ryde. He was survived by his wife Felicity, and their sons Colin and Michael and their families.
