= Aortic dissection =

Injury to the innermost layer of the aorta

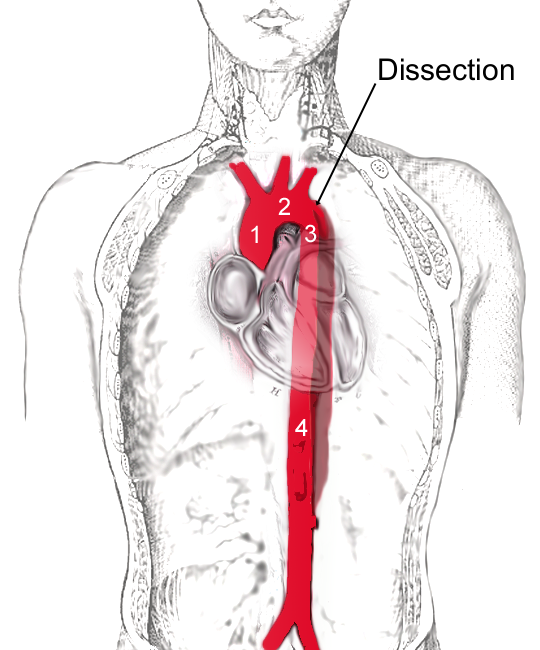
- Stanford type B dissection of the descending part of the aorta (3), which starts from the left subclavian artery and extends to the abdominal aorta (4). The ascending aorta (1) and aortic arch (2) shown in the image are not involved in this condition.
- Specialty: Vascular surgery, cardiothoracic surgery, emergency medicine, interventional radiology
- Symptoms: Severe chest or back pain, vomiting, sweating, lightheadedness
- Complications: Stroke, mesenteric ischemia, myocardial ischemia, aortic rupture
- Usual onset: Sudden
- Risk factors: High blood pressure, Marfan syndrome, Loeys–Dietz syndrome, Turner syndrome, bicuspid aortic valve, previous heart surgery, major trauma, smoking
- Diagnostic method: Medical imaging
- Prevention: Blood pressure control, not smoking
- Treatment: Depends on the type
- Prognosis: Mortality without treatment 10% (type B), 50% (type A)
- Frequency: 3 per 100,000 per year

Aortic dissection explanation video

Aortic dissection (AD) occurs when an injury to the innermost layer of the aorta allows blood to flow between the layers of the aortic wall, forcing the layers apart. In most cases, this is associated with a sudden onset of agonizing chest or back pain, often described as "tearing" in character. Vomiting, sweating, and lightheadedness may also occur. Damage to other organs may result from the decreased blood supply, such as stroke, lower extremity ischemia, or mesenteric ischemia. Aortic dissection can quickly lead to death from insufficient blood flow to the heart or complete rupture of the aorta.

AD is more common in those with a history of high blood pressure; a number of connective tissue diseases that affect blood vessel wall strength including Marfan syndrome and Ehlers–Danlos syndrome; a bicuspid aortic valve; and previous heart surgery. Major trauma, smoking, cocaine use, pregnancy, a thoracic aortic aneurysm, inflammation of arteries, and abnormal lipid levels are also associated with an increased risk. The diagnosis is suspected based on symptoms with medical imaging, such as CT scan, MRI, or ultrasound used to confirm and further evaluate the dissection. The two main types are Stanford type A, which involves the first part of the aorta, and type B, which does not.

Prevention is by blood pressure control and smoking cessation. Management of AD depends on the part of the aorta involved. Dissections that involve the first part of the aorta (adjacent to the heart) usually require surgery. Surgery may be done either by opening the chest or from inside the blood vessel. Dissections that involve only the second part of the aorta can typically be treated with medications that lower blood pressure and heart rate, unless there are complications which then require surgical correction. Complications that require surgical correction include blood leaking outside of the aorta, or reduced blood flow to organs due to the dissection causing a blockage of blood vessels that branch from the aorta.

AD is relatively rare, occurring at an estimated rate of three per 100,000 people per year. It is more common in men than women. The typical age at diagnosis is 63, with about 10% of cases occurring before the age of 40. Without treatment, about half of people with Stanford type A dissections die within three days and about 10% of people with Stanford type B dissections die within one month. The first case of AD was described in the examination of King George II of Great Britain following his death in 1760. Surgery for AD was introduced in the 1950s by Michael E. DeBakey.

== Signs and symptoms ==
About 96% of individuals with AD present with severe pain that had a sudden onset. The pain may be described as a tearing, stabbing, or sharp sensation in the chest, back, or abdomen. About 17% of individuals feel the pain migrate as the dissection extends down the aorta. The location of pain is associated with the location of the dissection. Anterior chest pain is associated with dissections involving the ascending aorta, while interscapular (between the scapula bones in the back) back pain is associated with descending aortic dissections. If the pain is pleuritic in nature, it may suggest acute pericarditis caused by bleeding into the sac surrounding the heart. This is particularly dangerous, suggesting that acute pericardial tamponade may be imminent. Pericardial tamponade is the most common cause of death from AD.

While the pain may be confused with that of a heart attack, AD is usually not associated with the other suggestive signs, such as heart failure and ECG changes. Less common symptoms that may be seen in the setting of AD include congestive heart failure (7%), fainting (9%), stroke (6%), ischemic peripheral neuropathy, paraplegia, and cardiac arrest. If the individual fainted, about half the time it is due to bleeding into the pericardium, leading to pericardial tamponade. Neurological complications of aortic dissection, such as stroke and paralysis, are due to the involvement of one or more arteries supplying portions of the brain.

If the AD involves the abdominal aorta, compromise of one or both renal arteries occurs in 5–8% of cases which may cause kidney damage, while ischemia of the intestines occurs about 3% of the time.

=== Blood pressure ===
People with AD often have a history of high blood pressure. The blood pressure is quite variable at presentation with acute AD. It tends to be higher in individuals with a distal dissection. In individuals with a proximal AD, 36% present with hypertension, while 25% present with hypotension. Proximal AD tends to be associated with weakening of the vascular wall due to cystic medial degeneration. In those who present with distal (Stanford type B) AD, 60–70% present with high blood pressure, while 2–3% present with low blood pressure.

Severe hypotension at presentation is a grave prognostic indicator. It is usually associated with pericardial tamponade, severe aortic insufficiency, or rupture of the aorta.

=== Aortic insufficiency ===
Aortic insufficiency (AI) occurs in half to two-thirds of ascending AD, and the diastolic heart murmur of aortic insufficiency is audible in about 32% of proximal dissections. The intensity (loudness) of the murmur depends on the blood pressure and may be inaudible in the event of low blood pressure.

Multiple causes exist for AI in the setting of ascending AD. The dissection may dilate the annulus of the aortic valve, preventing the leaflets of the valve from coapting. The dissection may extend into the aortic root and detach the aortic valve leaflets. Alternatively, following an extensive intimal tear, the intimal flap may prolapse into the left ventricular outflow tract, causing intimal intussusception into the aortic valve, thereby preventing proper valve closure.

=== Myocardial infarction ===
Heart attack occurs in 1–2% of aortic dissections. Infarction is caused by the involvement of the coronary arteries, which supply the heart with oxygenated blood, in the dissection. The right coronary artery is involved more commonly than the left coronary artery. If the myocardial infarction is treated with thrombolytic therapy, the mortality increases to over 70%, mostly due to bleeding into the pericardial sac, causing cardiac tamponade.

== Predisposing factors ==
Aortic dissection is associated with hypertension (high blood pressure) and many connective tissue disorders. Vasculitis (inflammation of an artery) is rarely associated with aortic dissection. It can also be the result of chest trauma. About 72 to 80% of individuals who present with an aortic dissection have a previous history of hypertension. Use of stimulants such as cocaine and methamphetamine is also a modifiable risk factor for AD. It can also be caused by smoking.

A bicuspid aortic valve (a type of congenital heart disease involving the aortic valve) is found in 7–14% of individuals who have an aortic dissection. These individuals are prone to dissection in the ascending aorta. The risk of dissection in individuals with bicuspid aortic valves is not associated with the degree of stenosis of the valve.

Connective tissue disorders such as Marfan syndrome, Ehlers–Danlos syndrome, and Loeys–Dietz syndrome increase the risk of aortic dissection. Similarly, vasculitides such as Takayasu's arteritis, giant cell arteritis, polyarteritis nodosa, and Behçet's disease have been associated with a subsequent aortic dissection. Marfan syndrome is found in 5–9% of individuals who had an aortic dissection. In this subset, the incidence in young individuals is increased. Individuals with Marfan syndrome tend to have aneurysms of the aorta and are more prone to proximal dissections of the aorta.

Turner syndrome also increases the risk of aortic dissection, by aortic root dilatation.

Chest trauma leading to aortic dissection can be divided into two groups based on cause: blunt chest trauma (commonly seen in car accidents) and iatrogenic. Iatrogenic causes include trauma during cardiac catheterization or due to an intra-aortic balloon pump.

Aortic dissection may be a late sequela of heart surgery. About 18% of individuals who present with an acute aortic dissection have a history of open-heart surgery. Individuals who have undergone aortic valve replacement for aortic insufficiency are at particularly high risk because aortic regurgitation causes increased blood flow in the ascending aorta. This can cause dilatation and weakening of the walls of the ascending aorta.

In December 2018, the U.S. Food and Drug Administration (FDA) issued a warning that fluoroquinolones may increase the risk of aortic aneurysm and aortic dissection, particularly in older adults and in patients with hypertension, Marfan syndrome, Ehlers-Danlos syndrome, atherosclerosis, peripheral vascular disease, or a history of aneurysms.

Syphilis only potentially causes aortic dissection in its tertiary stage.

== Pathophysiology ==
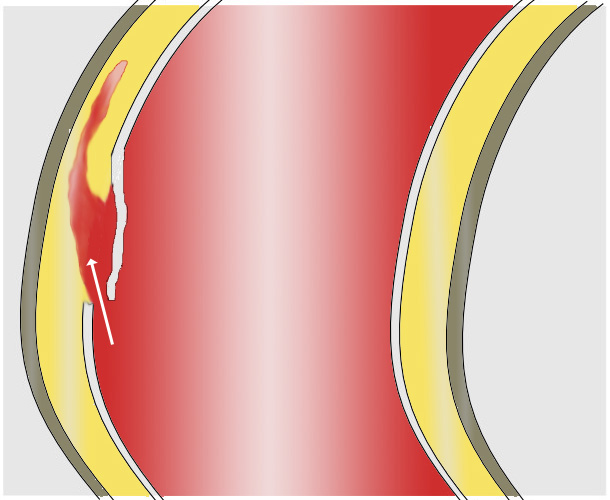
Blood penetrates the intima and enters the media layer.

As with all other arteries, the aorta is made up of three layers, the intima, the media, and the adventitia. The intima is in direct contact with the blood inside the vessel, and mainly consists of a layer of endothelial cells on a basement membrane; the media contains connective and muscle tissue, and the vessel is protected on the outside by the adventitia, comprising connective tissue.

In an aortic dissection, blood penetrates the intima and enters the media layer. The high pressure rips the tissue of the media apart along the laminated plane splitting the inner two-thirds and the outer one-third of the media apart. This can propagate along the length of the aorta for a variable distance forward or backward. Dissections that propagate towards the iliac bifurcation (with the flow of blood) are called anterograde dissections and those that propagate towards the aortic root (opposite of the flow of blood) are called retrograde dissections. The initial tear is usually within 100 mm of the aortic valve, so a retrograde dissection can easily compromise the pericardium leading to a hemopericardium. Anterograde dissections may propagate all the way to the iliac bifurcation of the aorta, rupture the aortic wall, or recanalize into the intravascular lumen leading to a double-barrel aorta. The double-barrel aorta relieves the pressure of blood flow and reduces the risk of rupture. Rupture leads to hemorrhaging into a body cavity, and prognosis depends on the area of rupture. Retroperitoneal and pericardial ruptures are both possible.

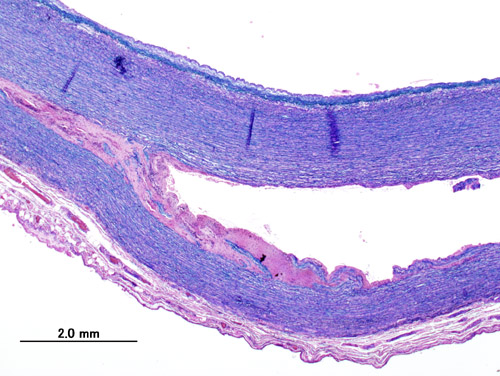
Histopathological image of dissecting aneurysm of the thoracic aorta in a patient without evidence of Marfan syndrome: The damaged aorta was surgically removed and replaced by artificial vessel, Victoria blue and HE stain.

The initiating event in aortic dissection is a tear in the intimal lining of the aorta. Due to the high pressures in the aorta, blood enters the media at the point of the tear. The force of the blood entering the space between the intima and media layers causes the tear to extend. It may extend proximally (closer to the heart) or distally (away from the heart) or both. The blood travels through the space, creating a false lumen (the true lumen is the normal conduit of blood in the aorta). Separating the false lumen from the true lumen is a layer of intimal tissue known as the intimal flap.

Two-thirds of aortic dissections involve the ascending aorta, the rest involve only the descending aorta (type B aortic dissections).

While it is not always clear why an intimal tear may occur, quite often it involves degeneration of the collagen and elastin that make up the media. This is known as cystic medial necrosis and is most commonly associated with Marfan syndrome and is also associated with Ehlers–Danlos syndrome.

In about 13% of aortic dissections, no evidence of an intimal tear is found. In these cases, the inciting event is thought to be an intramural hematoma (caused by bleeding within the media). Since no direct connection exists between the true lumen and the false lumen in these cases, diagnosing an aortic dissection by aortography is difficult if the cause is an intramural hematoma. An aortic dissection secondary to an intramural hematoma should be treated the same as one caused by an intimal tear.

== Diagnosis ==
Because of the varying symptoms of aortic dissection, the diagnosis is sometimes difficult to make. Concern should be increased in those with low blood pressure, neurological problems, and unequal pulses.

The diagnosis of aortic dissection is made by visualization of the intimal flap on a diagnostic imaging test. The gold standard test is CT angiography of the aorta. Other possible tests include a CT scan of the chest, cardiac magnetic resonance (MRI), or echocardiography.

=== D-dimer ===
A measurement of blood D-dimer level may be useful in diagnostic evaluation. A level less than 500 ng/ml may be considered evidence against a diagnosis of aortic dissection, although this guideline is only applicable in cases deemed "low risk" and within 24 hours of symptom onset. The American Heart Association does not advise using this test in making the diagnosis, as evidence is still tentative.

=== Chest X-ray ===
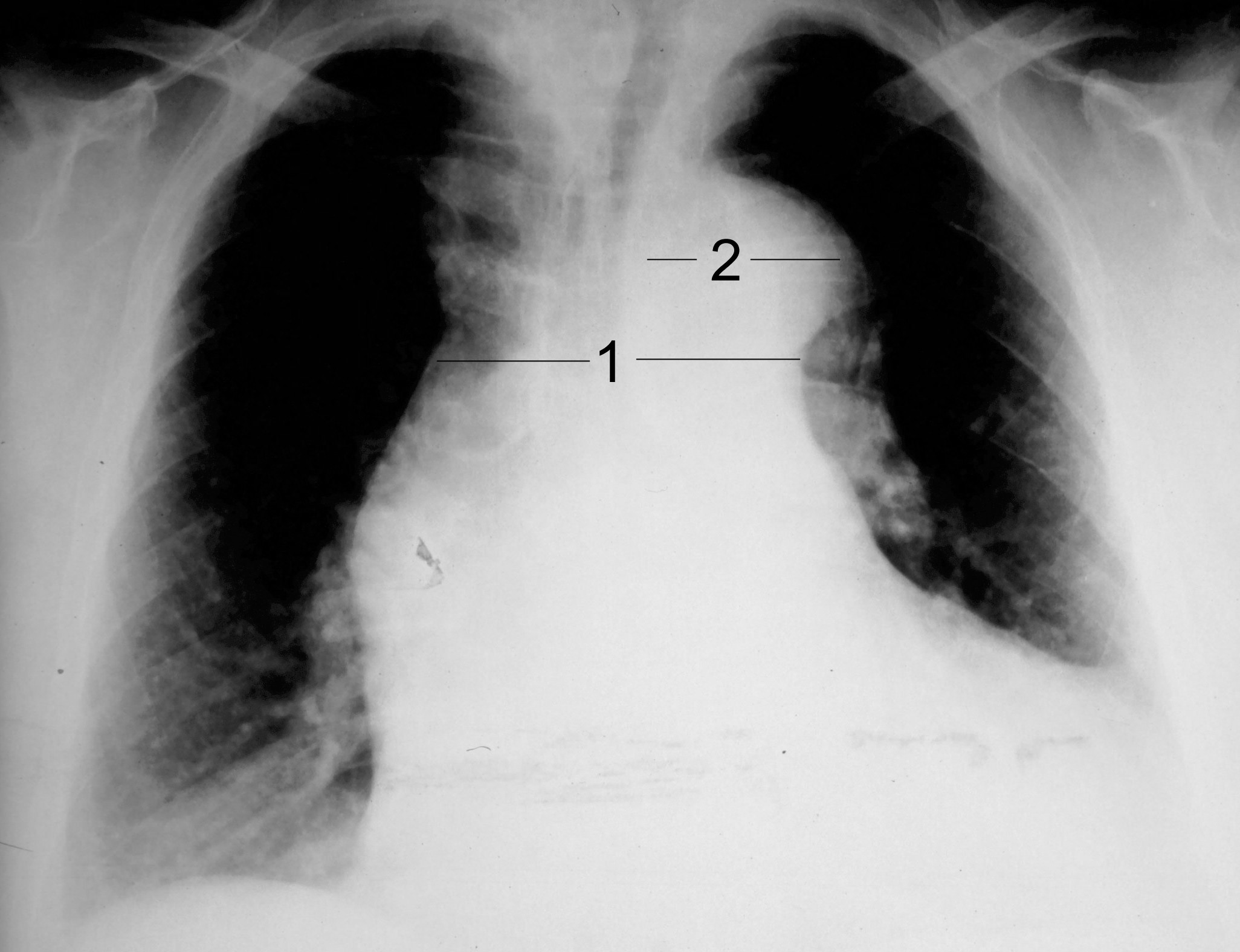
Aortic dissection on CXR: Note is made of a wide aortic knob.

According to the American Heart Association (AHA) a chest x-ray should not be used to diagnose or assess for aortic dissections. The AHA states that chest x-rays are not adequately sensitive nor specific to accurately diagnose aortic dissections.

However, certain findings on a chest x-ray may suggest an aortic dissection. These findings include: widening of the mediastinum, disruption of the normal contour of the aortic knob, the calcium sign (a separation of more than 5 mm of the calcified intimal plaque layer from the aortic wall), a "double density" seen in the aorta, and deviation of the trachea to the right.

=== Computed tomography ===
Computed tomography angiography has a 98-100% sensitivity and specificity for diagnosing aortic dissections. It is the initial recommended test and also the most commonly used imaging test in the diagnosis of aortic dissections, being utilized in 74-77% of cases in population based studies.

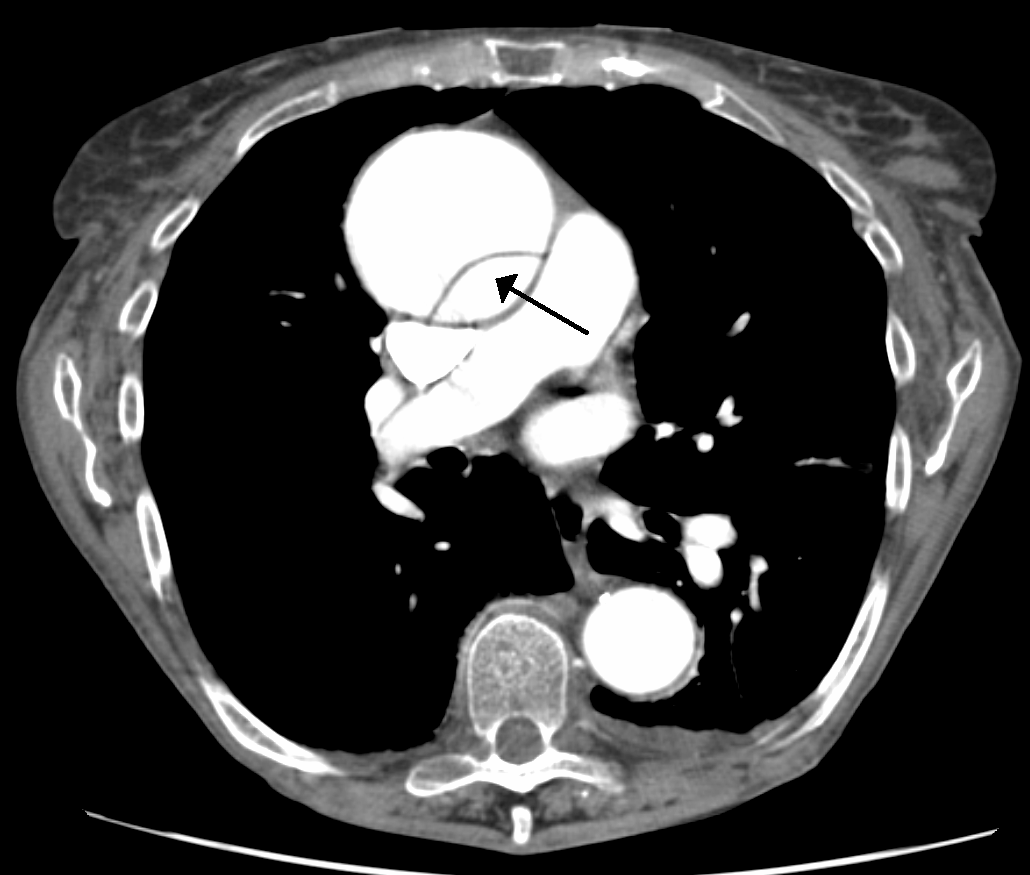
CT with contrast demonstrating aneurysmal dilation and a dissection of the ascending aorta (type A Stanford)

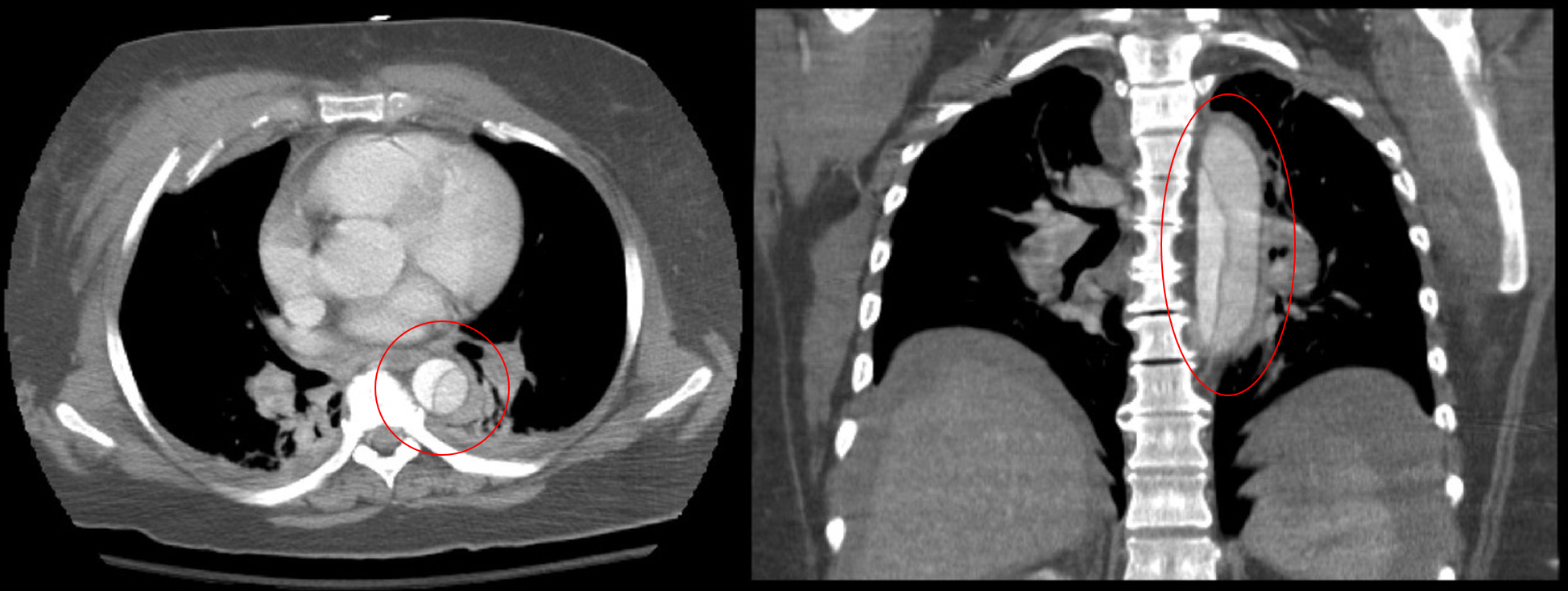
Chest CT with descending (type B Stanford) aortic dissection (red circle)

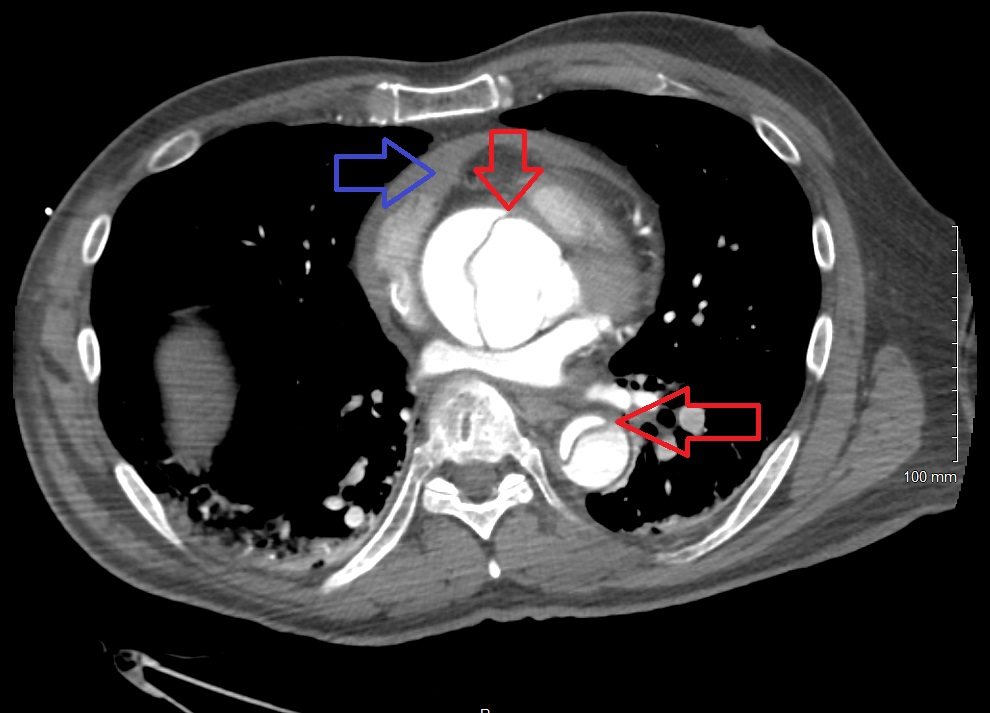
Type A dissection with pericardial effusion as a result.

=== MRI ===
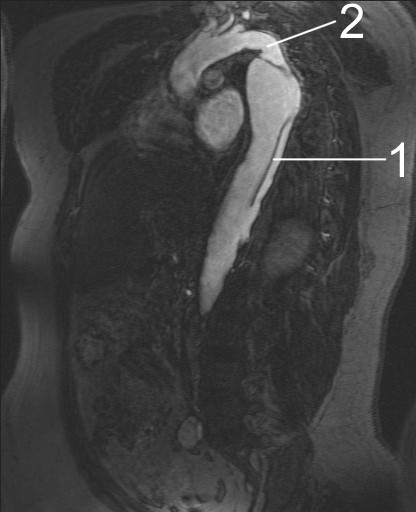
MRI of an aortic dissection: 1. Aorta descendens with dissection; 2. Aorta isthmus

Magnetic resonance imaging (MRI) has a sensitivity of 97-100% and specificity of 94-100% in the diagnosis of aortic dissections. MRIs take up to 20–30 minutes to complete and therefore may not be suitable for use in people who are critically ill, such as those with aortic dissections. MRIs are also not available in many resource limited settings. MRIs do not expose the person to potentially harmful ionizing radiation.

=== Ultrasound ===
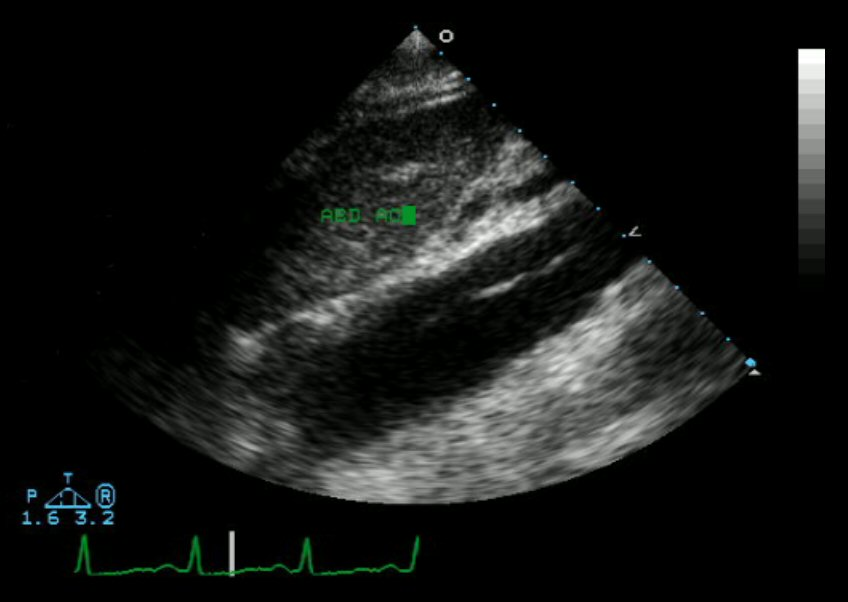
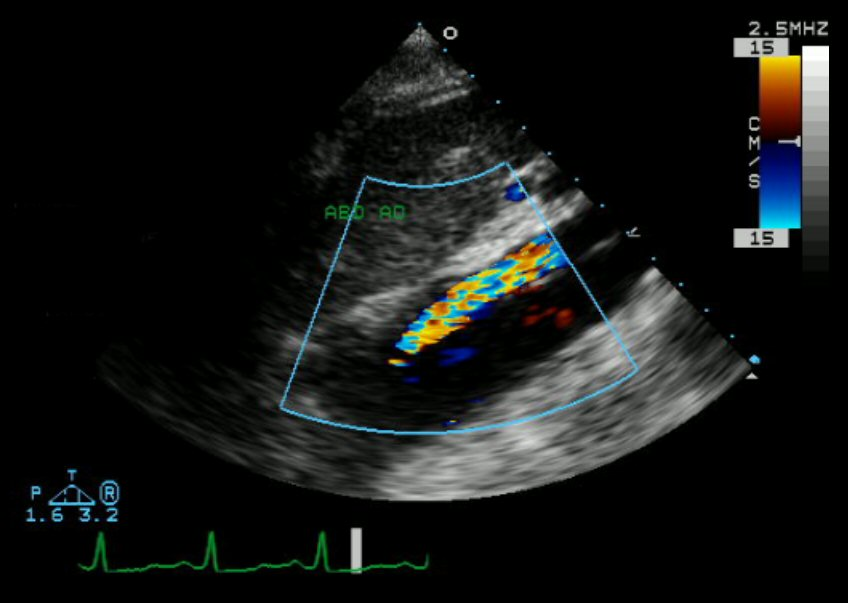
An echocardiogram displaying the true lumen and false lumen of an aortic dissection: In the image to the left, the intimal flap can be seen separating the two lumens. In the image to the right, color flow during ventricular systole suggests that the upper lumen is the true lumen.

Transthoracic echocardiography is not recommended in the evaluation of aortic dissections owing to its limited ability to evaluate the aortic arch, the descending aorta or the blood vessels branching from the aorta. Its sensitivity may be further reduced in patients with obesity or lung emphysema. Transthoracic echocardiography has high sensitivity in evaluating the aortic root and proximal ascending aorta. It can also be done at bedside and no sedation is required. It may also identify complications of aortic dissection including heart failure, pericardial effusion with possible cardiac tamponade, and aortic valve regurgitation or other valve disorders.

Transesophageal echocardiography has a sensitivity of 96.8% and specificity of 100% in the diagnosis of aortic dissections. It is also able to assess the descending aorta in the thorax. It can also assess the aortic valve and other heart valves, as well as assess the true lumen or false lumin of aortic dissections, which can help guide surgical repair planning and options. Transesophageal echocardiography requires the person to be sedated.

Aortic dissection with an intramural hematoma as seen on TEE

Type A aortic dissection

Type A aortic dissection

Dissection of both the thoracic and abdominal aorta

Dissection of both the thoracic and abdominal aorta

=== Aortogram ===
An aortogram involves injection of contrast material while taking X-rays of the aorta. Once commonly used, its use has since been supplanted by less invasive and more sensitive imaging modalities. The American Heart Association does not recommend the use of aortograms as a first line imaging modality in the diagnoses of aortic dissections. They note that aortograms have limited sensitivity and are more invasive than other tests.

== Classification ==
Classification of aortic dissection
Percentage	60%	10–15%	25–30%
Type	DeBakey I	DeBakey II	DeBakey III
	Stanford A (proximal)		Stanford B (distal)

Several different classification systems have been used to describe aortic dissections. One such classification is based on chronicity and labels aortic dissections as hyperacute (<24 hours duration), acute (2–7 days), subacute (8–30 days), and chronic (>30 days). The systems commonly in use are based on either the anatomy of the dissection or the duration of onset of symptoms before the presentation. The Stanford system is used more commonly now, as it is more attuned to the management of the patient.

=== DeBakey ===
The DeBakey system, named after cardiothoracic surgeon Michael E. DeBakey, is an anatomical description of the aortic dissection. It categorizes the dissection based on where the original intimal tear is located and the extent of the dissection (localized to either the ascending aorta or descending aorta or involving both the ascending and descending aorta).

- Type I – originates in ascending aorta, and propagates at least to the aortic arch and often beyond it distally. It is most often seen in patients less than 65 years of age and is the most lethal form of the disease.
- Type II – originates in the ascending aorta and is confined to it.
- Type III – originates in the descending aorta and rarely extends proximally, but will extend distally. It most often occurs in elderly patients with atherosclerosis and hypertension.

=== Stanford ===
The Stanford classification is divided into two groups, A and B, depending on whether the ascending aorta is involved.

- A – TAAD involves the ascending aorta and/or aortic arch, and possibly the descending aorta. The tear can originate in the ascending aorta, the aortic arch, or more rarely, in the descending aorta. It includes DeBakey types I and II.
- B – TBAD involves the descending aorta or the arch (distal to the left subclavian artery), without the involvement of the ascending aorta. It includes DeBakey type III.

The Stanford classification is useful as it follows clinical practice, as type A ascending aortic dissections generally require primary surgical treatment, whereas type B dissections generally are treated medically as initial treatment with surgery reserved for any complications.

The main indication for surgical repair of type A dissections is the prevention of acute hemorrhagic pericardial tamponade due to leakage of blood through the dissected layers of the intrapericardial proximal aorta. A secondary indication is acute aortic valve insufficiency (regurgitation): ascending aortic dissections often involve the aortic valve, which, having lost its suspensory support, telescopes down into the aortic root, resulting in aortic incompetence. The valve must be resuspended to be reseated, as well as to repair or prevent coronary artery injury. Also, the area of dissection is removed and replaced with a Dacron graft to prevent further dissection from occurring. However, type B dissections are not improved, from a mortality point of view, by the operation, unless leaking, rupture, or compromise to other organs, e.g. kidneys, occurs.

== Prevention ==
Among the recognized risk factors for aortic dissection, hypertension, abnormally high levels of lipids (such as cholesterol) in the blood, and smoking tobacco are considered preventable risk factors.

Repair of an enlargement of the ascending aorta from an aortic aneurysm or previously unrecognized and untreated aortic dissections is recommended when greater than 5.5 cm (2.2 in) in size to decrease the risk of dissection. Repair may be recommended when greater than 4.5 cm (1.8 in) in size if the person has one of the several connective-tissue disorders or a family history of a ruptured aorta.

== Management ==
In an acute dissection, treatment choice depends on its location. For Stanford type A (ascending aortic) dissection, surgical management is superior to medical management. For uncomplicated Stanford type B (distal aortic) dissections (including abdominal aortic dissections), medical management is preferred over surgery. Complicated Stanford type B aortic dissections require surgical intervention after initiation of medical therapy, with endovascular stent-grafting (TEVAR) available as a less invasive alternative to surgery. Complications in type B aortic dissections that require TEVAR or surgical correction are aortic rupture or blood leak outside the aorta, and organ malperfusion due to the dissection blocking branch vessels from the aorta.

The risk of death due to aortic dissection is highest in the first few hours after the dissection begins, and decreases afterward. Because of this, the therapeutic strategies differ for the treatment of an acute dissection compared to a chronic dissection. An acute dissection is one in which the individual presents within the first two weeks. If the individual has managed to survive this window period, their prognosis is improved. About 66% of all dissections present in the acute phase. Individuals who present two weeks after the onset of the dissection are said to have chronic aortic dissections. These individuals have been self-selected as survivors of the acute episode and can be treated with medical therapy as long as they are stable.

=== Medication ===
For type B aortic dissections, patients without rupture of the aorta or organ perfusion abnormalities may be treated with medications. For others, including those with type A aortic dissections, surgery is preferred. Aortic dissection generally presents as a hypertensive emergency, and the main consideration of medical management is to decrease the shear stress in the aortic wall by decreasing blood pressure and the heart rate. The target blood pressure should be a mean arterial pressure (MAP) of 60 to 75 mmHg or a systolic blood pressure between 100-120 mmHg, or the lowest blood pressure tolerated. Initial decreases should be by about 20%. The target heart rate is 60-80 beats per minute. Long-term blood pressure control is required for every person who has experienced aortic dissection.

Beta blockers are the first-line treatment for patients with acute and chronic aortic dissection. In acute dissection, fast-acting agents can be given intravenously and have doses that are easier to adjust (such as esmolol, propranolol, or labetalol) is preferred. Vasodilators such as sodium nitroprusside can be considered for people with ongoing high blood pressure, but they should never be used alone, as they often stimulate a reflexive increase in the heart rate.

Opiates are commonly used for relief of severe pain and may lower the blood pressure further.

Calcium channel blockers can be used in the treatment of aortic dissection, particularly if a contraindication to the use of beta-blockers exists.

If the individual has refractory hypertension (persistent hypertension on the maximum doses of three different classes of antihypertensive agents), involvement of the renal arteries in the aortic dissection plane should be considered.

=== Surgical ===
Indications for the surgical treatment of aortic dissection include an acute proximal aortic dissection and an acute distal aortic dissection with one or more complications. Complications include compromise of a vital organ, rupture or impending rupture of the aorta, retrograde dissection into the ascending aorta. These are more common with a history of Marfan syndrome or Ehlers–Danlos syndrome.

The objective in the surgical management of aortic dissection is to resect (remove) the most severely damaged segments of the aorta and to obliterate the entry of blood into the false lumen (both at the initial intimal tear and any secondary tears along the vessel). While excision of the intimal tear may be performed, it does not significantly change mortality.

The particular treatment used depends on the segment or segments of the aorta involved. Some treatments are:

- Open aortic surgery with replacement of the damaged section of the aorta with a tube graft (often made of Dacron) when no damage to the aortic valve is seen
- Bentall procedure – replacement of the damaged section of the aorta and replacement of the aortic valve
- David procedure – replacement of the damaged section of the aorta and reimplantation of the aortic valve
- Thoracic endovascular aortic repair, a minimally invasive surgical procedure usually combined with ongoing medical management
- Frozen elephant trunk procedure (FET) is one-stage procedure for the repair of acute aortic dissection that permits concurrent total aortic arch replacement with antegrade delivery of a descending aortic stent-graft which itself functions as a proximal landing zone to facilitate prospective endovascular intervention (TEVAR) to treat residual or de novo disease in the more distal aorta.

A number of comorbid conditions increase the surgical risk of repair of an aortic dissection. These conditions include the following:

- Prolonged preoperative evaluation (increased length of time prior to surgery)
- Advanced age
- Comorbid disease states (e.g.: coronary artery disease)
- Aneurysm leakage
- Cardiac tamponade
- Shock - obstructive shock
- Past history of myocardial infarction
- History of kidney failure (either acute or chronic kidney failure)

=== Follow-up ===
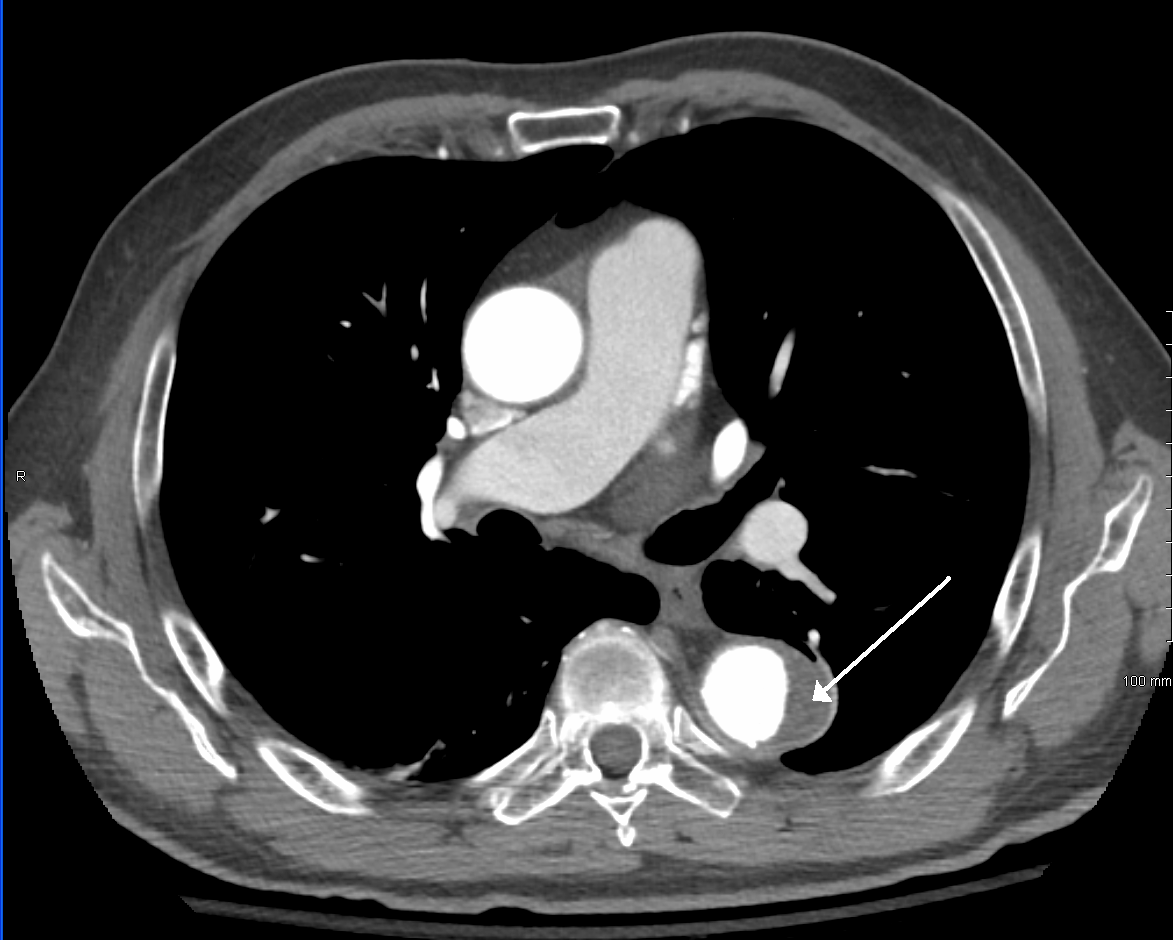
Closure of the lumen of a Type B aortic dissection following medical management

Patients who have suffered aortic dissection are at risk of aortic aneurysm formation at the site of the dissection, thought to be due to weakening of the aortic wall. The risk of this aneurysm degeneration is 10 times higher in individuals who have uncontrolled hypertension, compared to individuals with a systolic pressure below 130 mmHg.

Regarding long term mortality after aortic dissection, the risk of death is highest in the first two years after the acute event. About 29% of late deaths following surgery are due to rupture of either a dissecting aneurysm or another aneurysm. The rate of aortic aneurysm formation after dissection in the affected section of aorta is 25-40%. Other studies estimate a 17% to 25% incidence of new aneurysm formation, typically due to dilatation of the residual false lumen. These new aneurysms are more likely to rupture, due to their thinner walls.

Serial imaging of the aorta is recommended after dissection to assess for progression of the dissection, durability of the repair, screen for aneurysm formation, and assess aortic remodeling. Repeat imaging of the aorta after type B dissections is recommended at 1, 6, 12 months after diagnosis and then yearly.

== Prognosis ==
Risk of death in untreated type A aortic dissection
Risk	Timespan
25%	in first 24 hours
50%	in first 72 hours
80%	in two weeks
90%	in first month

Of all people with aortic dissection, 40% die immediately and do not reach a hospital in time. Of the remainder, 1% die every hour, making prompt diagnosis and treatment a priority. Even after diagnosis, 5–20% die during surgery or in the immediate postoperative period. In ascending aortic dissection, if surgery is decided to be not appropriate, 75% die within 2 weeks. With aggressive treatment, 30-day survival for thoracic dissections may be as high as 90%.

== Epidemiology ==
Establishing the incidence of aortic dissection has been difficult because many cases are only diagnosed after death (which may have been attributed to another cause), and is often initially misdiagnosed. Aortic dissection affects an estimated 2.0–3.5 people per every 100,000 every year. Studies from Sweden suggest that the incidence of aortic dissection may be rising. Men are more commonly affected than women: 65% of all people with aortic dissection are male. The mean age at diagnosis is 63 years. In females before the age of 40, half of all aortic dissections occur during pregnancy (typically in the third trimester or early postpartum period). Dissection occurs in about 0.0004% of pregnancies.

== History ==
The earliest fully documented case of aortic dissection is attributed to Frank Nicholls in his autopsy report of King George II of Great Britain, who had been found dead on 25 October 1760; the report describes a dissection of the aortic arch and into the pericardium. The term "aortic dissection" was introduced by the French physician J. P. Maunoir in 1802, and René Laennec labeled the condition "dissecting aneurysm". London cardiologist Thomas Bevill Peacock contributed to the understanding of the condition by publishing two series of the cases described in the literature so far: 19 cases in an 1843 review, and 80 in 1863. The characteristic symptom of tearing pain in the chest was recognized in 1855 when a case was diagnosed in life.

Surgery for aortic dissection was first introduced and developed by Michael E. DeBakey, Denton Cooley, and Oscar Creech, cardiac surgeons associated with the Baylor College of Medicine, Houston, Texas, in 1954. DeBakey developed aortic dissection himself at age 97 in 2005, and underwent surgery in 2006. Endovascular treatment of aortic dissection was developed in the 1990s.

== Notable cases ==
- In 1989 Lucille Ball, aged 77, was diagnosed with a dissecting aortic aneurysm and underwent a seven hour surgery to repair her aorta and replace her aortic valve. She died after surgery due to an unrelated abdominal aortic aneurysm that had burst.
- Playwright Jonathan Larson, best known for the musical Rent, died in 1996 at the age of 35 of an aortic dissection believed to be due to undiagnosed Marfan syndrome.
- Three's Company actor John Ritter died from a thoracic aortic dissection in 2003, at the age of 54 after he was misdiagnosed and mistakenly treated for a heart attack by his two doctors. The Ritter Rules were developed to help people spot the early signs of an aortic dissection.
- Days of Our Lives and Babylon 5 actor Richard Biggs died in 2004, at the age of 44 due to complications from aortic dissection.
- Lux Interior of The Cramps died in 2009 at the age of 62 following an aortic dissection.
- Alan Thicke died in 2016 of type-A aortic dissection at the age of 69.
- Japanese actress Hiromi Tsuru died in her car from aortic dissection in 2017 at the age of 57.
- Taiwanese entertainer Alien Huang died of an aortic dissection in 2020 at the age of 36.
- Kentaro Miura, writer and artist of the manga Berserk, died from aortic dissection in 2021 at the age of 54.
- In 2021, New Zealand cricketer Chris Cairns was paralyzed from the waist down after an aortic dissection at the age of 51.
- In 2021, guitarist Richie Faulkner of the English heavy metal band Judas Priest suffered an aortic dissection whilst performing at a concert at the age of 41.
- In 2022, keyboardist Andy Fletcher (a founding member of the UK band Depeche Mode) died unexpectedly from an aortic dissection at the age of 60.
- U.S. senator Lindsey Graham died in 2026 at the age of 71; the District of Columbia medical examiner's preliminary findings gave the cause of death as aortic dissection due to arteriosclerotic cardiovascular disease.

== See also ==
- Carotid artery dissection
- Vertebral artery dissection
- Isolated Superior Mesenteric Artery Dissection (ISMAD)

== Sources ==
- Demers P, Miller DC (2016). "Type A Aortic Dissection". Sabiston and Spencer Surgery of the Chest. Elsevier. ISBN 978-0-323-24126-7.
