= Charlie Purdy =

New Zealand boxer

Charlie Francis Purdy
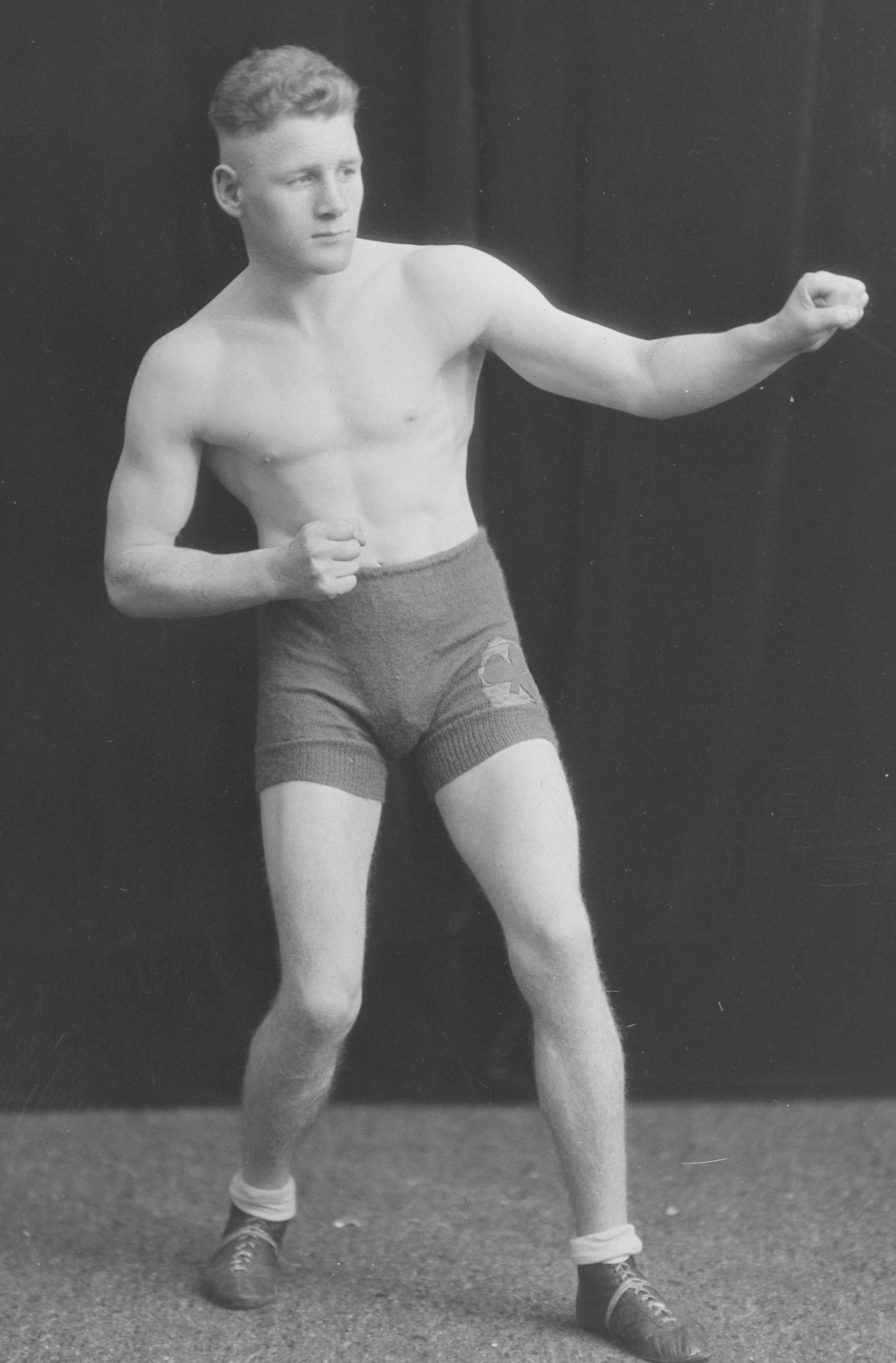

Personal information
- Nickname: "Charlie"
- Nationality: New Zealand
- Born: Charles Francis Purdy; 12 December 1905 Auckland, New Zealand
- Died: 25 January 1982 (aged 76) Sydney, New South Wales, Australia
- Height: 154

Boxing career

Boxing record
- Total fights: 80
- Wins: 49
- Win by KO: 1
- Losses: 21
- Draws: 6
- No contests: 4

Charles Francis Purdy (12 December 1905 – 25 January 1982) was a New Zealand boxer who competed in the 1924 Summer Olympics.

In 1924 he was eliminated in the first round of the lightweight class after losing his fight to Frenchman Arnold Tholey. The result of the fight was controversial, Purdy, the crowd and one of the judges believing Purdy had clearly won the fight; the other judge and the French referee giving the fight to Tholey.

After the Games he travelled to Dublin where he won the Irish welterweight title.

He later moved to Australia; in 1929 losing the welterweight championship of Australia to Wally Hancock in Sydney by being knocked out for the first time; he was 10 st 2 1/2 lb (58.3 kg).

On 7 January 1930, Purdy married Vera Garnett. Her drunkenness and infidelities led him to divorce his wife on 18 April 1935. During his time with Vera, he partnered with past athlete Anthony William Winter in a billiard saloon in Sydney.

He is remembered by the Charlie Purdy Cup of the Auckland Boxing Association, and for his weaving:

- Ralph Aitken "weaved and ducked like a Charlie Purdy."
- Billy Parris "used Charlie Purdy’s famous weave."
