= Mark Purdey =

English organic farmer (died 2006)

- Born: John Mark Purdey; 25 December 1953; Much Hadham, Hertfordshire, England
- Died: 12 November 2006 (aged 52); Elworthy, Somerset, England
- Occupations: Organic farmer, environmental campaigner
- Known for: Research and campaigning concerning BSE
- Spouse: Margaret Urwin
- Website: http://www.markpurdey.com

John Mark Purdey (25 December 1953 – 12 November 2006) was an English organic farmer and environmental campaigner. He became known for his controversial theories concerning the causes of bovine spongiform encephalopathy (BSE), commonly known as mad cow disease, arguing that the disease was caused by chemical pesticides.

== Early life and career ==
John Mark Purdey was born on 25 December 1953 in Much Hadham, Hertfordshire. He came from the Purdey family associated with the London gunsmithing firm James Purdey & Sons. He was educated at Haileybury College.

He subsequently became involved in organic agriculture and farmed in Ireland, Wales and England. He later established a dairy farm near Elworthy, Somerset, where he kept pedigree Jersey cattle.

== Pesticide dispute ==
In 1985, Purdey challenged requirements by the Ministry of Agriculture, Fisheries and Food (MAFF) to use organophosphate pesticides to control warble fly in cattle. He objected to the compulsory treatment of his cattle and pursued the matter through the High Court. He subsequently received an exemption from the treatment.

== BSE theories ==
Purdey began investigating BSE during the late 1980s. He proposed that exposure to organophosphate pesticides used in cattle treatment might contribute to the development of the disease. His hypothesis later developed into a broader theory involving agricultural chemicals, environmental conditions and mineral concentrations. He also studied the environment in cluster areas of BSE—in Colorado, Iceland, Italy and Slovakia—claiming to have found a high level of manganese and low levels of copper.

Purdey's proposed explanation was not accepted by investigations into the United Kingdom BSE outbreak. Reviews of the available evidence found no convincing association between chemical use and the geographical distribution of BSE. The BSE public inquiry, chaired by Lord Phillips, considered Purdey's evidence but did not accept his hypothesis as an explanation for the epizootic.

== Death and legacy ==
Purdey died from a brain tumour at his home in Elworthy on 12 November 2006, aged 52. His research was later published by his brother, although it was scrutinised for not referencing its sources.

== Sources ==
- "Solidarity: Mad cows and an Englishman". BBC News. 12 March 2001.
