= John Smith Purdy =

Scots-born physician and military physician

Dr John Smith Purdy FRSE DSO MID (1872–1936) was an early 20th-century Scots-born physician and military physician who came to fame in Tasmania and Australia.

== Life ==
He was born on 31 January 1872 in Glasgow, the son of George Purdy a market gardener and his wife, Frances Smith. The family moved to Morpeth in northern England in his infancy. He was educated at King Edward VI School, Morpeth. He then studied medicine at Aberdeen University graduating MB CM in 1898. In 1899 he joined his older brother Dr James Purdy at Otaki Hospital in New Zealand. However, after only a few months he volunteered to join the Second Boer War as a Surgeon-Captain in the New Zealand Mounted Rifles.

When he was demobilised in 1902 he went to London to seek employment and obtained a post at St Bartholomew's Hospital. He undertook a Diploma in Public Health at Cambridge University. He also returned to Aberdeen for his doctorate (MD) with a thesis on syphilis. After a few months as a GP in Liverpool he joined Dr E. T. Ross at the Quarantine Service in Egypt, as a Foreign Office nominee in 1905. In 1906 he was reposted to El-Tor in the Sinai district, overseeing the quarantine of pilgrims returning from Mecca.

In February 1907 he returned to New Zealand as a district medical officer in Auckland but found himself in competition with his brother James in terms of any more senior position. He therefore moved to Tasmaniain 1910 taking on the role of Chief Medical Officer (aged only 38). Here he introduced new food hygiene laws.

In 1911 he was elected a Fellow of the Royal Society of Edinburgh. His proposers were William Ramsay Smith, John Halliday Scott, Sir William Turner and Arthur Robinson.

He moved to Sydney in Australia in 1913 as Metropolitan Medical Officer of Health under Dr J. A. Thompson. Within a few weeks of the onset of the First World War he again volunteered, serving as a sanitary officer with the Australian Army Medical Corps attached to the 1st Division Australian forces in Egypt (where his local understanding was greatly beneficial). On 1 January 1916 he was promoted to Lt Colonel and placed in charge of sanitation at Tel-el-Kebir overseeing a camp of 30,000 ANZAC troops. In October 1916 he was attached to the 10th Field Ambulance Division on the western front in Belgium. He won the Distinguished Service Order (DSO) for his services at Messines Ridge in the summer of 1917. Also Mentioned in Dispatches he was promoted to temporary Colonel and oversaw the 3rd Australian General Hospital at Abbeville in France from January to June 1918.

He was returned to Australia before the end of the war to combat the spreading Spanish flu epidemic which had reached Australia on the returning hospital ships. He reached Sydney in September 1918 and began a year-long battle trying to combat the epidemic. The situation was worsened by two minor outbreaks of plague in Sydney in 1920. He was made President of the Health Society of New South Wales and Chairman of the Public Health Association and President of the Australian Association of Fighting Venereal Disease. In his position on the Town Planning Association of NSW he was influential in instigating a programme of slum clearance in Sydney.

He was also President of the Returned Sailors and Soldiers Imperial League of Australia and Deputy Chairman of the St John's Ambulance Association.

He died at St Luke's Hospital in Sydney on 26 July 1936. The "J S Purdy Memorial Medal" was struck in his honour by Sydney Technical College in the year of his death.

== Family ==
In 1904 he married Emily Crake. His son Cecil John Seddon Purdy was a well known chess player, author and magazine editor.

== Publications ==
- Better Sanitation for Ships Crews (1912)
- Australian Hygiene and Public Health (1932)
