= Stoneleigh, Darlinghurst =

Stoneleigh
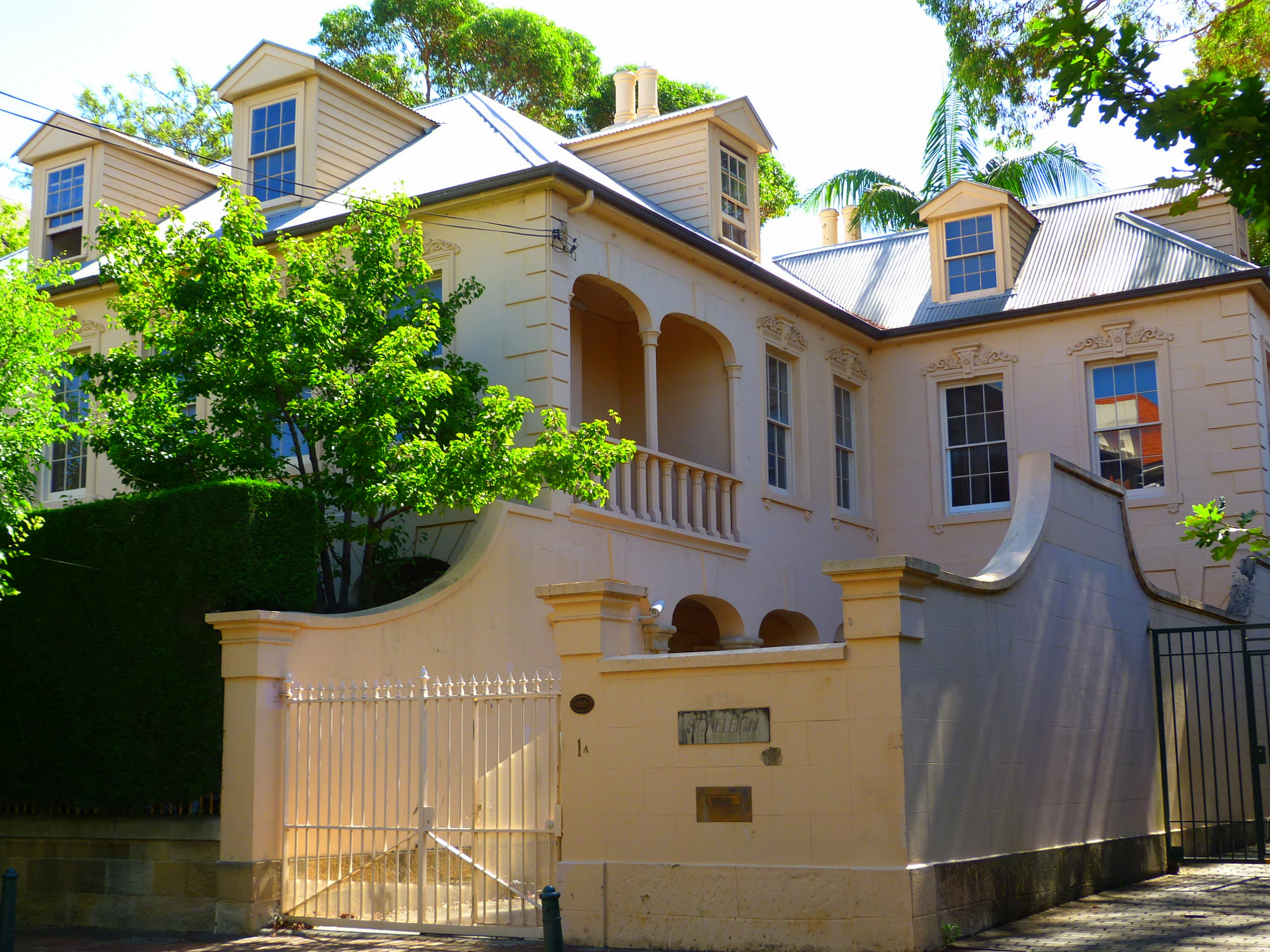

- Location within Sydney Location within Australia
- 33.8776°S 151.2195°E
- Location: 1 Darley Street, Darlinghurst, City of Sydney, New South Wales, Australia

History
- Built: 1860

New South Wales Heritage Register
- Official name: Stoneleigh
- Type: state heritage (built)
- Designated: 2 April 1999
- Reference no.: 187
- Type: Villa
- Category: Residential buildings (private)

Stoneleigh is a heritage-listed residence at 1 Darley Street in the inner city Sydney suburb of Darlinghurst in the City of Sydney local government area of New South Wales, Australia. It was built in 1860. It is also known as Greencourt. It was added to the New South Wales State Heritage Register on 2 April 1999.

== Description ==
Stoneleigh is a storey Victorian Regency style house, freestanding, with a hipped corrugated steel roof, a bank of 12 paned timber framed double hung windows to the first floor, and arched colonnade to the ground floor. It features a Victorian cast iron palisade fence. The colonnade extends around one side of the building. The building is constructed of stone and rendered brick. The columns to the colonnade are octagonal with moulded caps. The building also features articulated quoins.

== Significance ==
Stoneleigh is historically significant as a fine example of the mid Victorian villas of the wealthy, one of the earliest layers of the development of Darlinghurst. It is associated with two notable people who owned the building: Richard Jones, 1870–1892, who was Chairman of the Commercial Banking Company of Sydney, and founder of the Maitland Mercury newspaper; and J. Russell French, 1895–1905, who was General Manager of the Bank of New South Wales. It is aesthetically significant as an exceptionally fine example of a Victorian Regency villa.

== Heritage listing ==
Stoneleigh was listed on the New South Wales State Heritage Register on 2 April 1999.

== See also ==
- Iona, Darlinghurst
