= GA Zink and Sons Building =

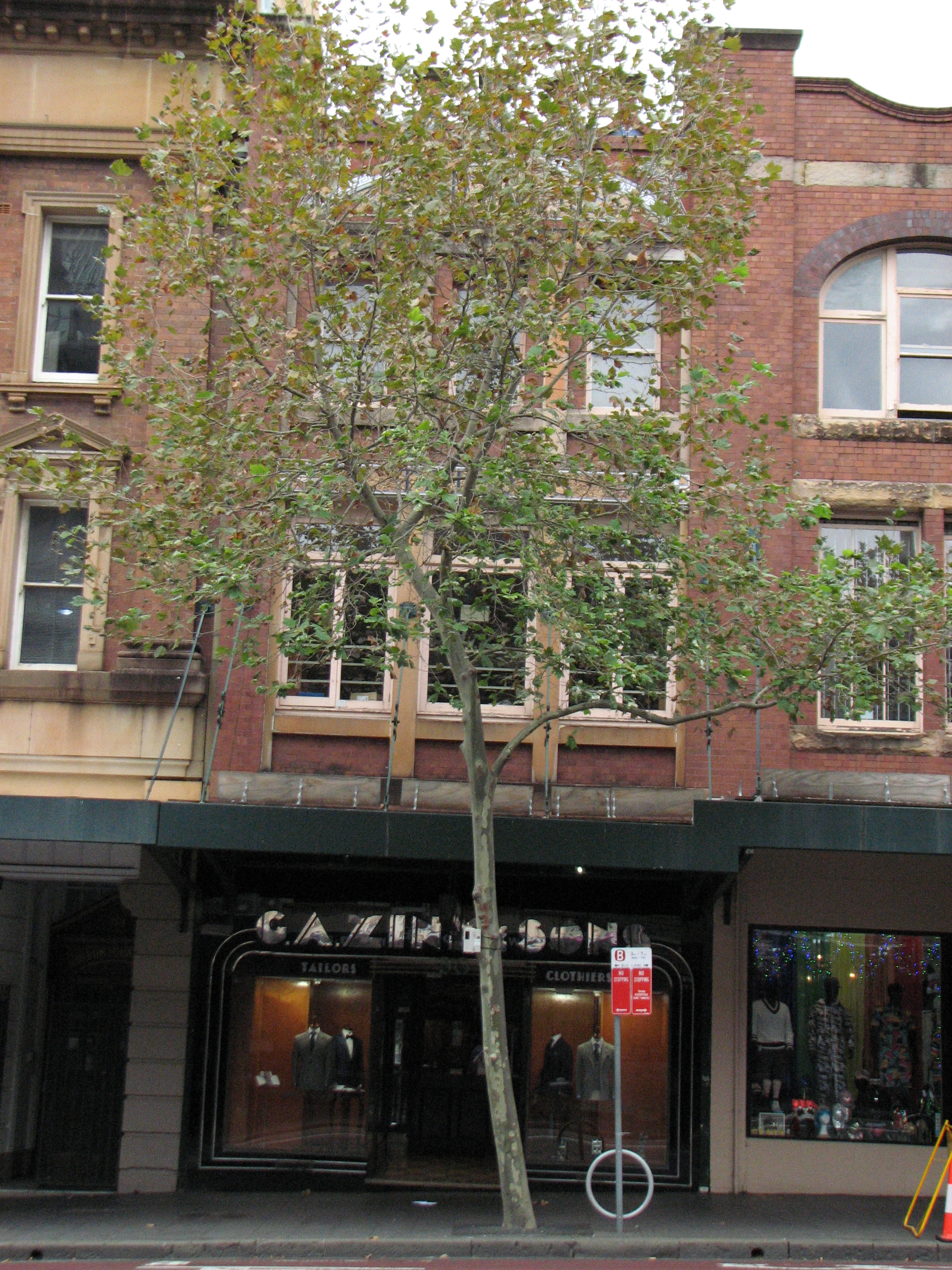
- GA Zink and Sons Building, 56 Oxford Street Darlinghurst NSW

- Location within Sydney Location within Australia
- 33.8785°S 151.2147°E
- Location: 56 Oxford Street, Darlinghurst, City of Sydney, New South Wales, Australia

History
- Founded: 1895
- Built: 1911–1912; 1938
- Built for: Gustav Adolph Zink

Site notes
- Architect(s): John Dunstan (1911); H & E Sidgreaves (1938)
- Architectural styles: Federation Arts and Crafts; Inter-war Art Deco
- Owner: Zink & Sons

New South Wales Heritage Register
- Official name: GA Zink & Sons Building
- Type: state heritage (built)
- Designated: 2 April 1999
- Reference no.: 658

New South Wales Heritage Database (Local Government Register)
- Official name: Commercial Building "GA Zink & Sons" (56 Oxford Street) Including Interior
- Type: local heritage (built)
- Designated: 14 December 2012
- Part of: Sydney Local Environmental Plan 2012
- Reference no.: I384

The G. A. Zink & Sons Building is a heritage-listed retail building at 56 Oxford Street in the inner city Sydney suburb of Darlinghurst, New South Wales, in Australia. It has been home to the Zink & Sons tailoring firm since 1912, founded in 1895 by Gustav Adolph Zink. The building, including its Art Deco shopfront and interiors, was added to the New South Wales State Heritage Register on 2 April 1999.

== History ==
The tailoring business "G. A. Zink & Sons" was established in 1895 at 112 Oxford Street by German immigrant Gustav Adolph Zink, who in 1911 commissioned a four-storey premises at 56 Oxford Street, designed by architect John Dunstan and built by G. T. Brown around the first half of 1912 on a new block formed by the widening of Oxford Street and leased from the City of Sydney. Gustav Zink ran the business until his death on 28 August 1932, and is buried in Waverley Cemetery; he was succeeded in running the business by his son, Frank William Zink, who lived at "Devoncliffe" at 26 Lang Road, Centennial Park.

The business has continued at the 1912 location over several generations, experiencing booms in business in the interwar period and following World War II. The building was substantially renovated in the Inter-war period with a bold Art Deco style shopfront and entrance porch, designed by the shop-fitting firm of H. & E. Sidgreaves (who also made designs for the Paragon Cafe, Katoomba) and installed during the first half of 1938. Now known as "Zink & Sons", it continues to be operated as a family-run business, having been owned by the Jones Family since the late 1950s when Bill Jones took over the business from Thomas Zink.

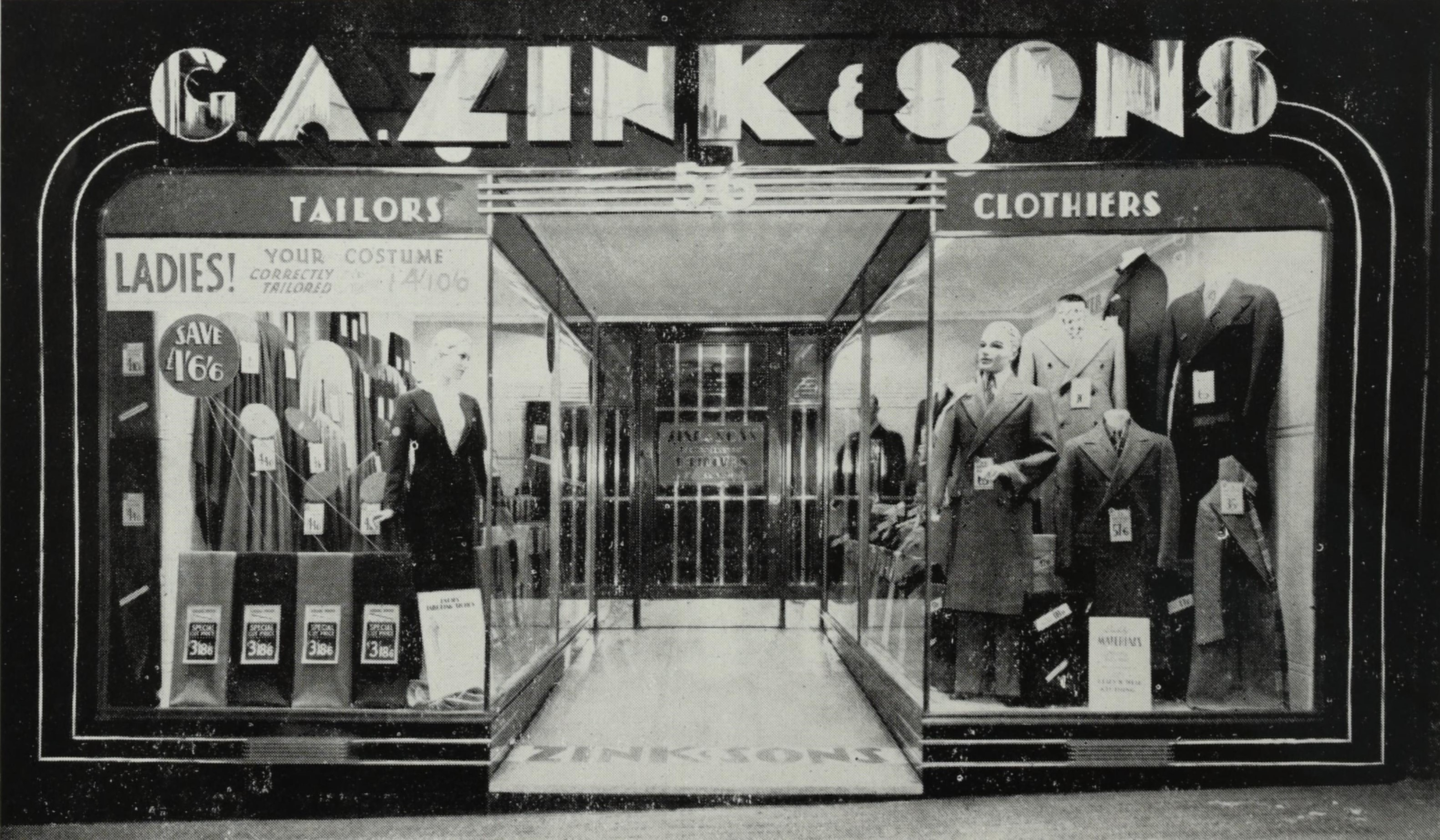
The Zink & Sons shopfront, published in Decoration and Glass (1 June 1938).

== Description ==
A three-storey Federation Arts and Crafts style commercial building, with a symmetrical Inter War Functionalist shopfront with recessed central porch that has a polychrome terrazzo floor. The display windows on either side are surrounded by black Vitrolite relieved by two fine stainless steel strips. The name of the store is located in the hamper and consists of large individual stainless steel lettering in a stylised "modern" letter face. Other lettering includes the street number mounted at the top of the display windows. The ground floor and first floor interior contains a large amount of early fabric, much of it dating from the 1920s, including shelving, cabinetry, stairs and balustrades, etched glazing, partitions, and leadlight glazing.

== Significance ==
No 56 Oxford Street is part of an architecturally consistent group of buildings that were the result of the resumption and widening of Oxford Street between Whitlam and Taylor Square. It is an exceptional and rare example of an Inter-War Functionalist style shopfront that is substantially intact, while the façade of the building at first and second floors incorporates finely detailed signage from the Federation era that is fully integrated with the fabric of the façade. The ground and first floor interior, despite modifications is a remarkably intact and rare example of a purpose-designed 1920s shop interior. It is the only building on the northern side of Oxford Street that was purpose-designed for a specific tenancy, G. A. Zink & Co, which has retained this original connection.

== Heritage listing ==
On 21 March 1978, the building was listed by the Australian Heritage Commission as part of the "Oxford Square Group" on the Commonwealth Register of the National Estate, which became non-statutory in 2007–2012. On 14 August 1985, the Minister for Planning and Environment, Bob Carr, placed an Interim Conservation Order on the building under Section 26 of the Heritage Act 1977, which was renewed by Carr on 4 December 1987. On 13 March 1989, the Minister for Planning, David Hay, placed a Permanent Conservation Order on the building under Section 35A of the Heritage Act. With the transformation of permanent conservation orders into the New South Wales State Heritage Register in the late 1990s, the building's listing under the Heritage Act was transferred to the new register on 2 April 1999.

The building first received local heritage listing by the City of South Sydney under the South Sydney Local Environmental Plan No. 101 on 23 June 1989, as part of the group of shopfronts at 52-70 Oxford Street. This listing was superseded by the South Sydney Local Environmental Plan 1998 on 24 April 1998. With the amalgamation of South Sydney Council into the City of Sydney in 2003–2004, the local listing for 56 Oxford Street continued under the 1998 instrument until the individual building, including its interiors and shopfront, was listed by the City of Sydney as a local heritage item on 14 December 2012 under the Sydney Local Environmental Plan 2012.
