= St Peter's Church, Darlinghurst =

St Peter's Church
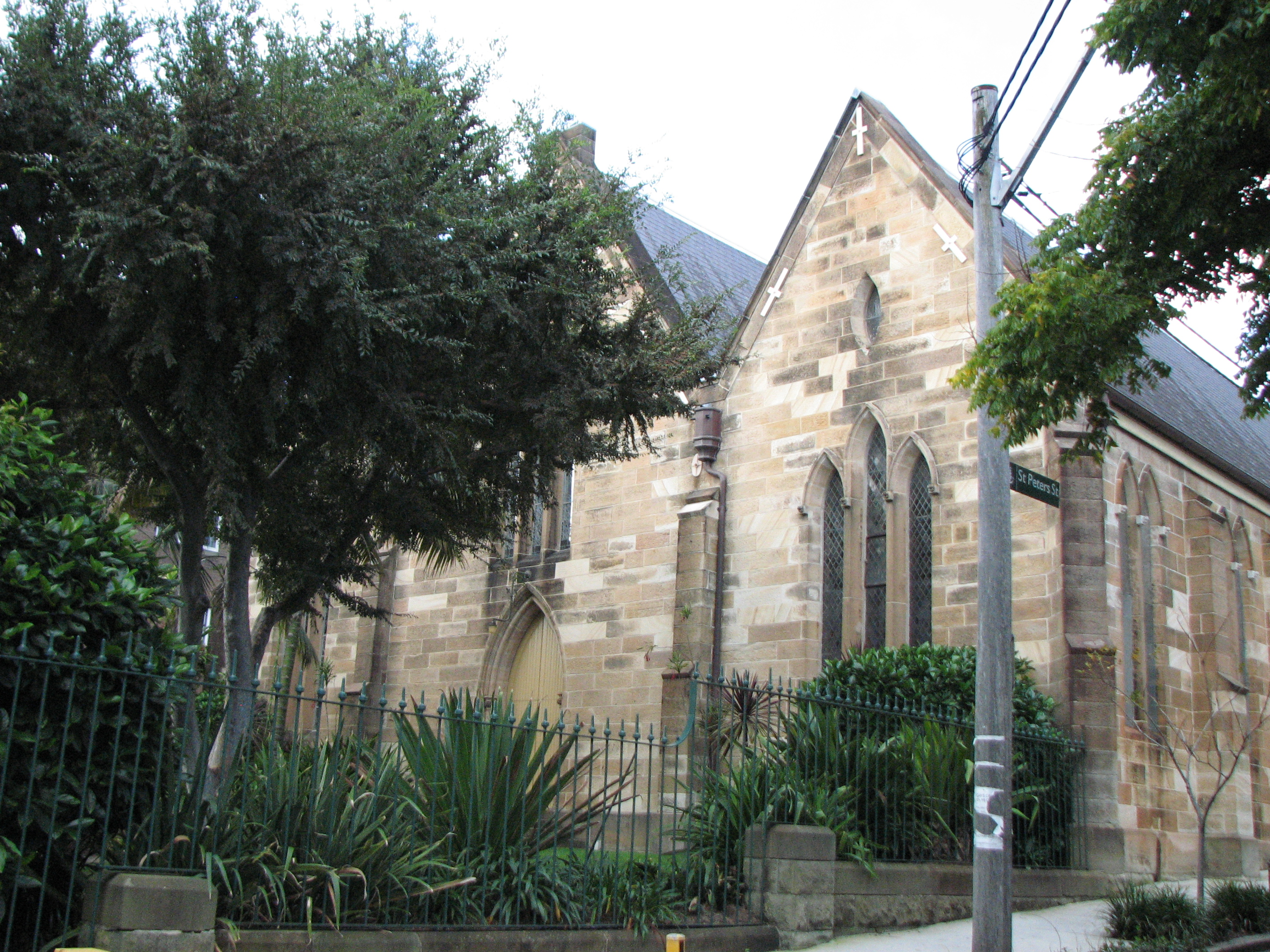
- St Peter's Church, Bourke Street and St Peters Street, Darlinghurst, NSW

- Location in greater metropolitan Sydney
- 33°52′30″S 151°13′07″E
- Location: Corner of Bourke Street and St Peters Street, Darlinghurst, City of Sydney, New South Wales
- Country: Australia
- Denomination: Anglican
- Website: windsoranglican.asn.au/home

History
- Status: Former church
- Consecrated: 8 December 1822 by Rev. Samuel Marsden

Architecture
- Functional status: Inactive; now a hall for use by SCEGGS Darlinghurst
- Architects: O. H. Lewis (church); Benjamin Backhouse (church hall)
- Architectural type: Victorian Gothic Revival
- Years built: 1866–67
- Closed: March 1993

New South Wales Heritage Register
- Official name: St. Peter's Church and Precinct
- Type: State heritage (built)
- Designated: 2 April 1999
- Reference no.: 148
- Type: Church
- Category: Religion

Register of the National Estate
- Official name: St Peters Anglican Church (former), 150-152 Bourke St, Darlinghurst, NSW, Australia
- Type: Defunct register
- Designated: 21 October 1980
- Reference no.: 2189
- Class: Historic

New South Wales Heritage Database (Local Government Register)
- Official name: Former St Peter's Church of England Group Including Former Church Hall and Small Store
- Type: Local government register
- Designated: 14 December 2012
- Type: Church
- Category: Religion

St Peter's Church is a heritage-listed former Anglican church precinct on the corner of Bourke Street and St Peters Street, in the inner city Sydney suburb of Darlinghurst in the City of Sydney local government area of New South Wales, Australia. It was added to the New South Wales State Heritage Register on 2 April 1999 and is listed on the (now defunct) Australian Register of the National Estate.

== History ==
The former church was built in 1866-67, with a vestry addition between 1871-83. It was designed by O. H. Lewis, son of Colonial Architect Mortimer Lewis, and is his only known work. The church hall, designed by Benjamin Backhouse, was built in 1873. In 1924, the church purchased five terrace houses along Forbes Street on land they had long sought to obtain and demolished them to create an entry and forecourt area.

It was associated with a number of prominent Sydney figures, including The Sydney Morning Herald owner Charles Kemp, Assistant Commissioner-General Henry Connell, businessman Lebbeus Hordern and author Patrick White. Hordern and Kemp were honoured with stained glass windows.

Amidst declining congregations and finances, the church became a branch of St John's Anglican Church in 1986 and was closed in March 1993. It was sold to SCEGGS Darlinghurst in September 1993.

The former church is now the school's Great Hall, while the former hall was refurbished in 1998 to serve as its Playhouse. The school has used the former church for Easter and Christmas services.

== Description ==
The former church is a two-storey sandstone building with a gabled slate roof, designed in the English Gothic Revival style. It consists of a nave with two aisles, a vestry and chancel.

The former hall is a single-storey brick building with a sandstone base. The upper hall was divided into three spaces as part of the 1998 refurbishment, while the lower hall retains its two original principal spaces.

== Heritage listing ==
St Peter's Church and Precinct was listed on the New South Wales State Heritage Register on 2 April 1999.

== See also ==
- List of former churches in Australia
