= Stanley Street, Sydney =

Street in Sydney, Australia

Stanley Street is a small street in the East Sydney locale, which is part of the suburb of Darlinghurst, Sydney, New South Wales.

== Description ==
Stanley Street is primarily residential, but was the centre of Sydney's original Italian community in the 1950s and 1960s, and was subsequently part of Sydney's first "Little Italy". Many Italian restaurants and cafes still line the street, and the street is home to the annual Primo Italiano festival.

The Bondi via Paddington tramway ran down Stanley Street until its closure and replacement by buses in 1960.
