= Darlinghurst =

- Suburb
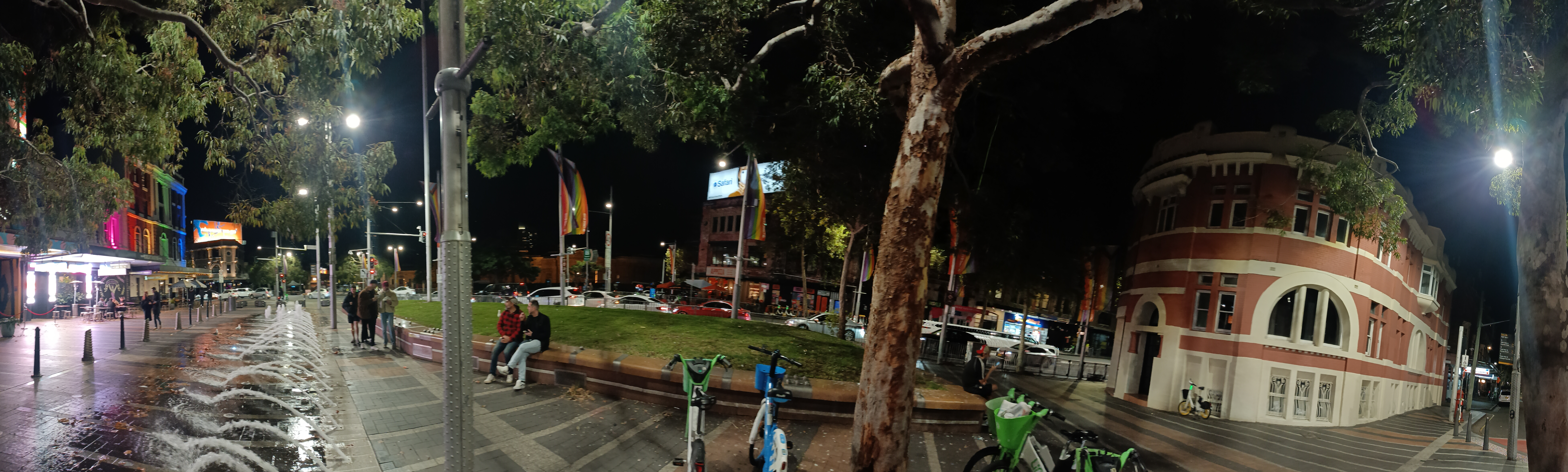
- Night time view of Taylor Square, Darlinghurst. 2026

- Interactive map of Darlinghurst
- Coordinates: 33°53′00″S 151°13′30″E
- Country: Australia
- State: New South Wales
- City: Sydney
- LGA: City of Sydney
- Location: 1 km (0.62 mi) east of Sydney CBD

Government
  - State electorate: Sydney
  - Federal divisions: Wentworth; Sydney

Area
  - Total: 0.86 km^{2} (0.33 sq mi)
- Elevation: 52 m (171 ft)

Population
  - Total: 10,615 (SAL 2021)
  - Density: 12,388/km^{2} (32,080/sq mi)
- Postcode: 2010
Suburbs around Darlinghurst
Sydney CBD	Woolloomooloo	Potts Point
Sydney CBD	Darlinghurst	Kings Cross
Surry Hills	Paddington	Paddington

Darlinghurst is an inner-city suburb in the eastern suburbs of Sydney, New South Wales, Australia. Darlinghurst is located immediately east of the Sydney central business district (CBD) and Hyde Park, within the local government area of the City of Sydney. It is often colloquially referred to as "Darlo".

Darlinghurst is a densely populated suburb with the majority of residents living in apartments or terraced houses. Once a slum and red-light district, Darlinghurst has undergone urban renewal since the 1980s to become a cosmopolitan area made up of precincts. Places such as Victoria Street (which connects Darlinghurst to Potts Point in the north), Stanley Street (Little Italy) and Crown Street (Vintage and Retro Fashion) are known as culturally rich destinations. These high street areas are connected by a network of lane-ways and street corners with shops, cafes and bars.

Demographically, Darlinghurst is home to the highest percentage of Generation X and Millennials in Australia. The majority of businesses in Darlinghurst are independently owned and operated small businesses with over 50% of all commercial activity in the area being consumer oriented: indie retail, food, drink, dining, leisure and personal services. Darlinghurst is also home to large number of off-street creative industries.

Darlinghurst's main street is Oxford Street, which runs east from the south-eastern corner of Hyde Park through Darlinghurst and Paddington and terminates at Bondi Junction. Oxford Street is one of Sydney's most famous shopping and dining strips. The Darlinghurst end is known around the world as the centre of Sydney's gay community, is the yearly parade route of the Sydney Mardi Gras and the spiritual birthplace of the LGBTQ rights movement. It is home to a number of gay venues and businesses, Darlinghurst is a centre of Sydney's burgeoning small bar scene.

From the 1990s onwards, Oxford Street began to garner a reputation for being Sydney's primary "nightclub strip", popular with both gay and straight clubbers, surpassing the notorious red-light district of Kings Cross in popularity. As a result of the influx of revellers, crime rates increased in the area around 2007, particularly for assaults and robberies. This reported increase should be understood in terms of a very low background crime rate in East Sydney in general. The 2014 lockout laws saw many nightclubs close and the crime rate drop once again, with a new focus on small bars, restaurants and cafes after the lockout laws ended in 2020.

There are a number of named localities in and around Darlinghurst including Taylor Square, Three Saints Square, and confusingly also East Sydney. Locals have used this name to refer to the area immediately around Stanley Street in the suburb's west, however the title is used more broadly throughout the area from Woolloomooloo up to Taylor Square where the old Darlinghurst Gaol still has the words East Sydney in brass lettering above the main entrance. This is because from 1900 to 1969 the entire area to the east of Sydney's CBD, from the harbour to Redfern, was an electorate known as the Division of East Sydney. Already in 1820 the entire ridge line running from Potts Point to Surry Hills was known as Eastern Hill.

Darlinghurst shares a postcode (2010) and an extensive soft southern border with neighbouring suburb Surry Hills which, with Paddington to the east and Woolloomooloo, Rushcutters Bay and Potts Point to the north, comprise the metropolitan region of East Sydney. Although only minutes walk away from the Sydney CBD, this region is geographically distinct from it; separated from the more well known commercial centre by several landmarks: Central railway station, Hyde Park, St Mary's Cathedral and The Domain. East Sydney hosts many well-known restaurants.

Sydney's Eastern Suburbs cover all the land from the east of Darlinghurst up to the Pacific Ocean.

== History ==
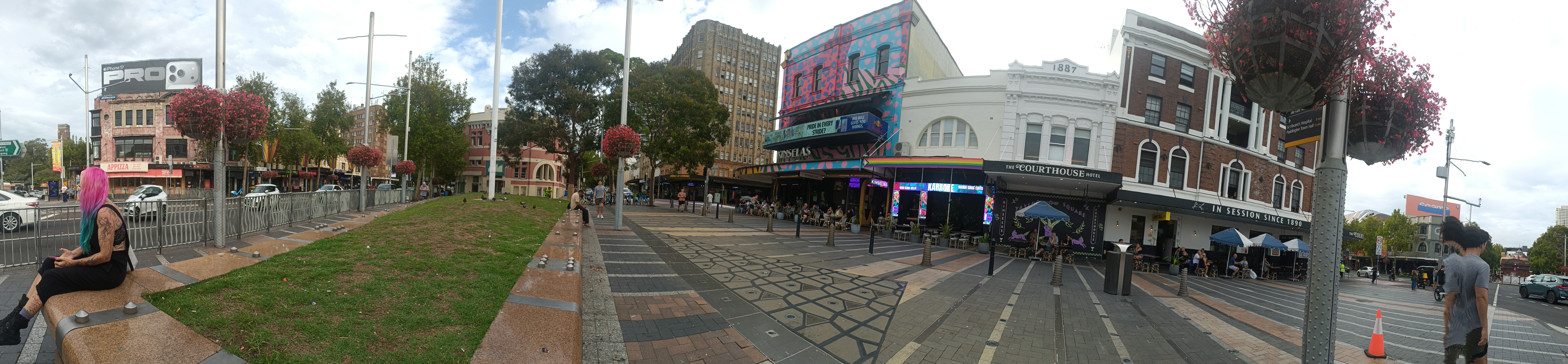
The southern end of Taylor Square adjacent to Oxford street. The locality is a centre of the city's nightlife, especially for its LGBTQIA+ community with a large rainbow flag and rainbow crossing having been installed in Taylor Square in 2014 and 2019 respectively. 2026.

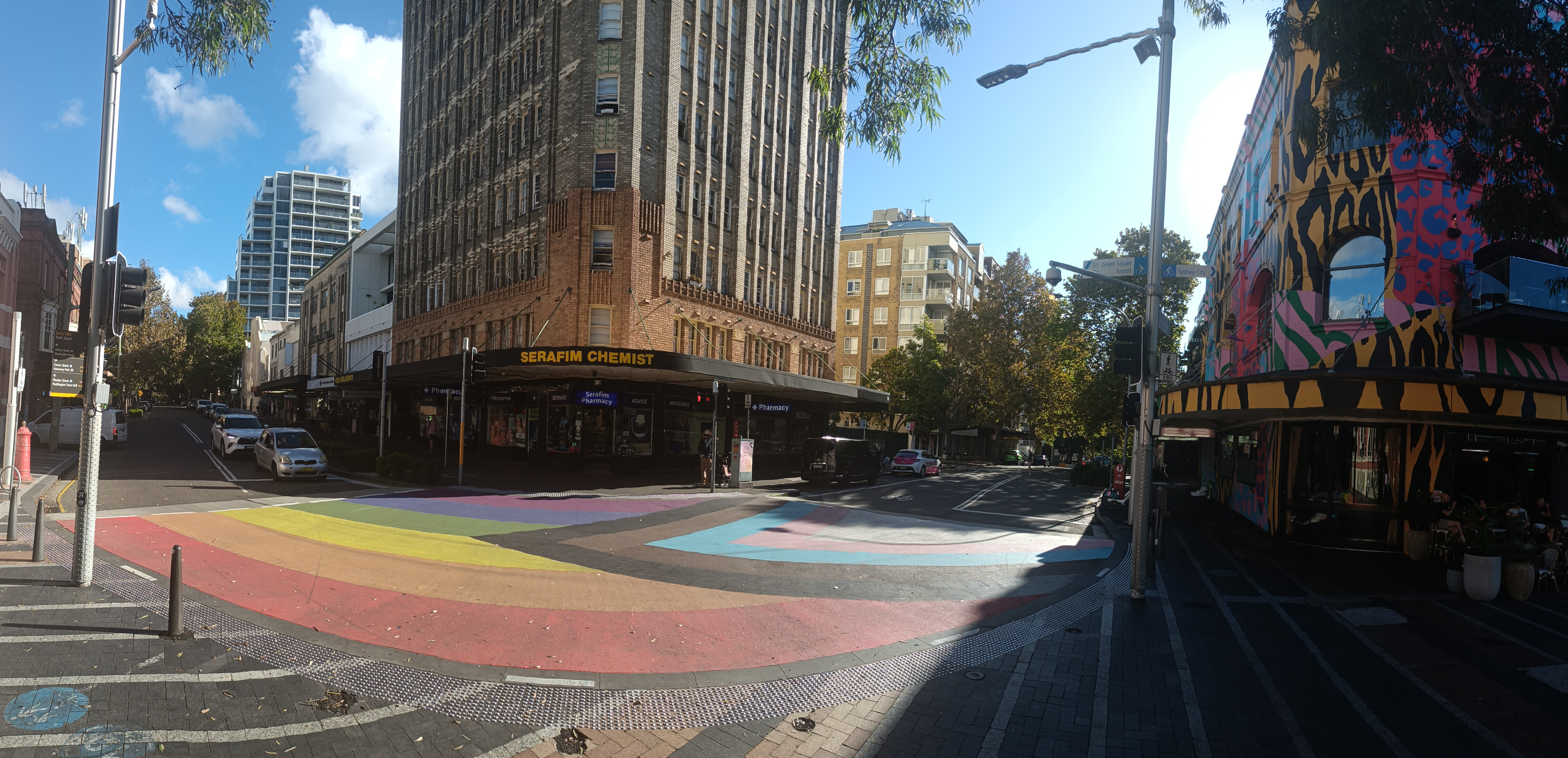
A rainbow crossing celebrating the area's LGBTQIA+ community. The crossing sits adjacent to Taylor Square, on the corner of Campbell and Bourke streets, on the border between Surry Hills and Darlinghurst. First created in 2019, it was updated in 2024 to include the progress pride flag.

The area now known as Darlinghurst lies on the traditional lands of Gadigal people. They continued to visit and use the place into the 1840s.

Although close to Sydney, rocky ridges and shallow soil made the area less attractive for the early settlers than other more productive, arable sites and it was not developed by European settlers until the early 19th century. Sandstone was quarried there, originally with convict labour, and it continued to be extracted there into the second half of the nineteenth century, using prisoners from the nearby Darlinghurst Gaol.

In the 19th century, the prominent ridge of Darlinghurst was the site of windmills that made use of the breezes from Sydney Harbour. In about 1819, Thomas Clarkson, a merchant, erected a windmill, built of stone with a rotating top, near what is now the intersection of Liverpool and Darley streets. Close by, two post mills were built. Thomas Hyndes built a fourth mill, close to Caldwell Street. The last of the mills, which reportedly stood until around 1873, was the Craigend mill. It was near Thomas Mitchell's Craigend villa, on the highest point of the ridge, near what is now the top of Beare's Stairs in Caldwell Street.

The area was originally known as Eastern Hill and then Henrietta Town, after Governor Lachlan Macquarie's wife, whose second name was Henrietta. The loyalties changed with the change of governors and the suburb became Darlinghurst in honour of Eliza Darling, the popular wife of Governor Ralph Darling, during the early 19th century. The suffix 'hurst' is derived from the Old English word hyrst, meaning wooded area.

The area became fashionable after Governor Ralph Darling selected the ridge line—from what is now Surrey Street and Tewkesbury Avenue in Darlinghurst, north to the end of Potts Point—as an area for homes of members of the colonial elite. Between 1828 and 1831, Darling made seventeen land grants to wealthy merchants, public servants and private citizens. He imposed stringent conditions on development of the land; all plans required his approval prior to construction, all houses had to be £1000 or more in value, and each piece of land could contain only a single residence and had to have a landscaped garden. Four of the villas were south of what is now William Street, within the Darlinghurst boundary. These were Barham, designed by John Verge for Edward Deas Thomson; Craigend, designed by and built for Surveyor General Sir Thomas Mitchell; Rose Hall, the house of Ambrose Hallen Town Surveyor and Colonial Architect; and Rosebank, likely designed by John Verge and built for Deputy Commissary-General James Laidley. All four villas survived into the twentieth century, but only Barham survives today, within the grounds of the Sydney Church of England Girls' Grammar School (SCEGGS).

The area became less fashionable once the Darlighurst Gaol opened in 1841. Later, the area became partly industrial. A notable factory was that of Sargent's Pies, in Burton Street, which was producing 150,000 pies a week there, by 1913.

The late 19th century saw Darlinghurst become the final days of English-born Australian novelist Ethel Pedley. She died at her home on 6 August 1898 at the age of 39 from complications of cancer whilst writing Dot and the Kangaroo, which would be retrospectively published a year later.

In 1973, Darlinghurst saw a green ban as a ban on all commercial construction was placed by the NSW Builders Labourers Federation (BLF) as residents demanded that all housing should be high density low-rise with adequate provision for low and middle income families to live within the inner-city area.

== Landmarks ==
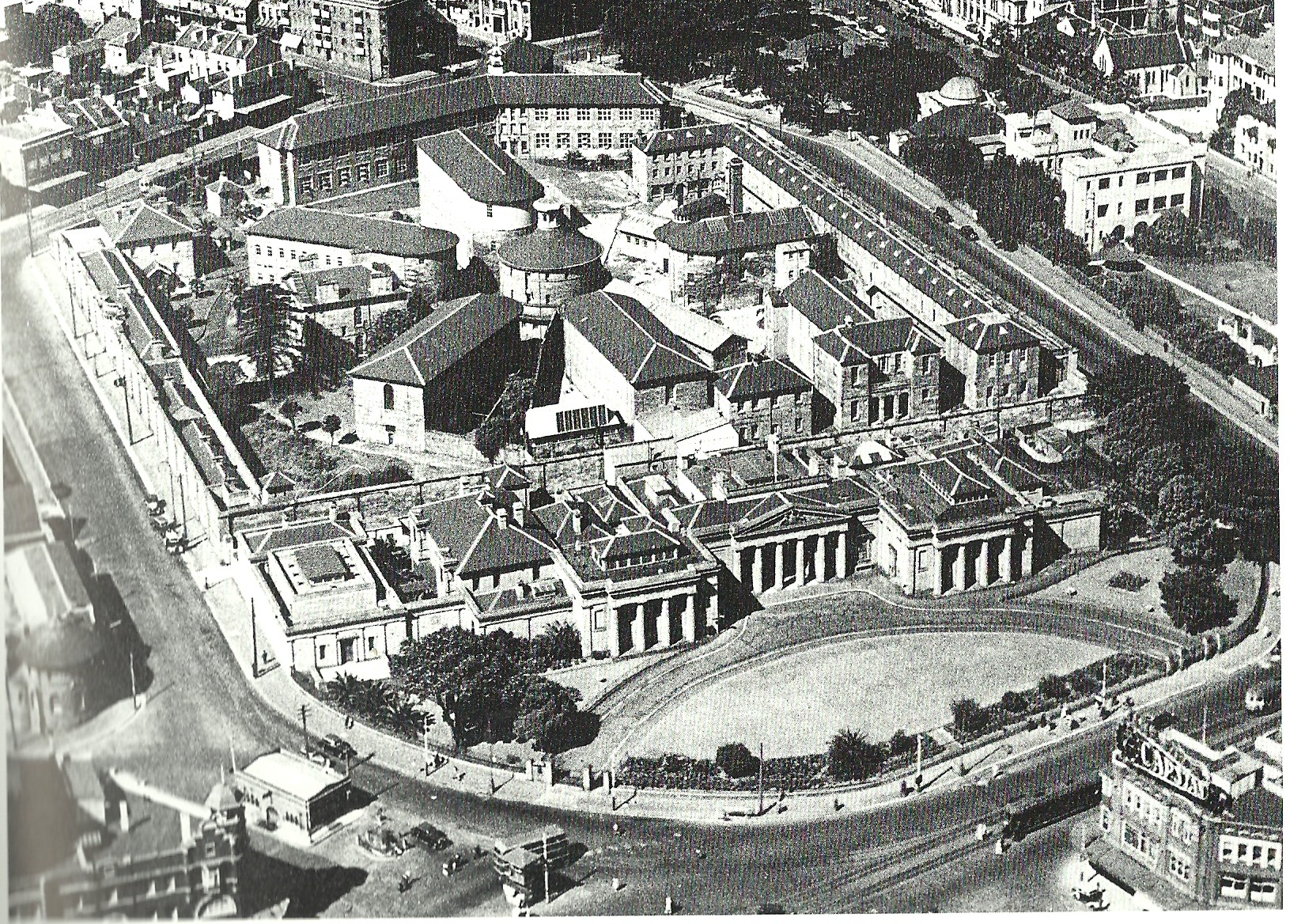
The Darlinghurst Gaol and the Darlinghurst Courthouse. The gaol is now the site of the National Art School. 1930

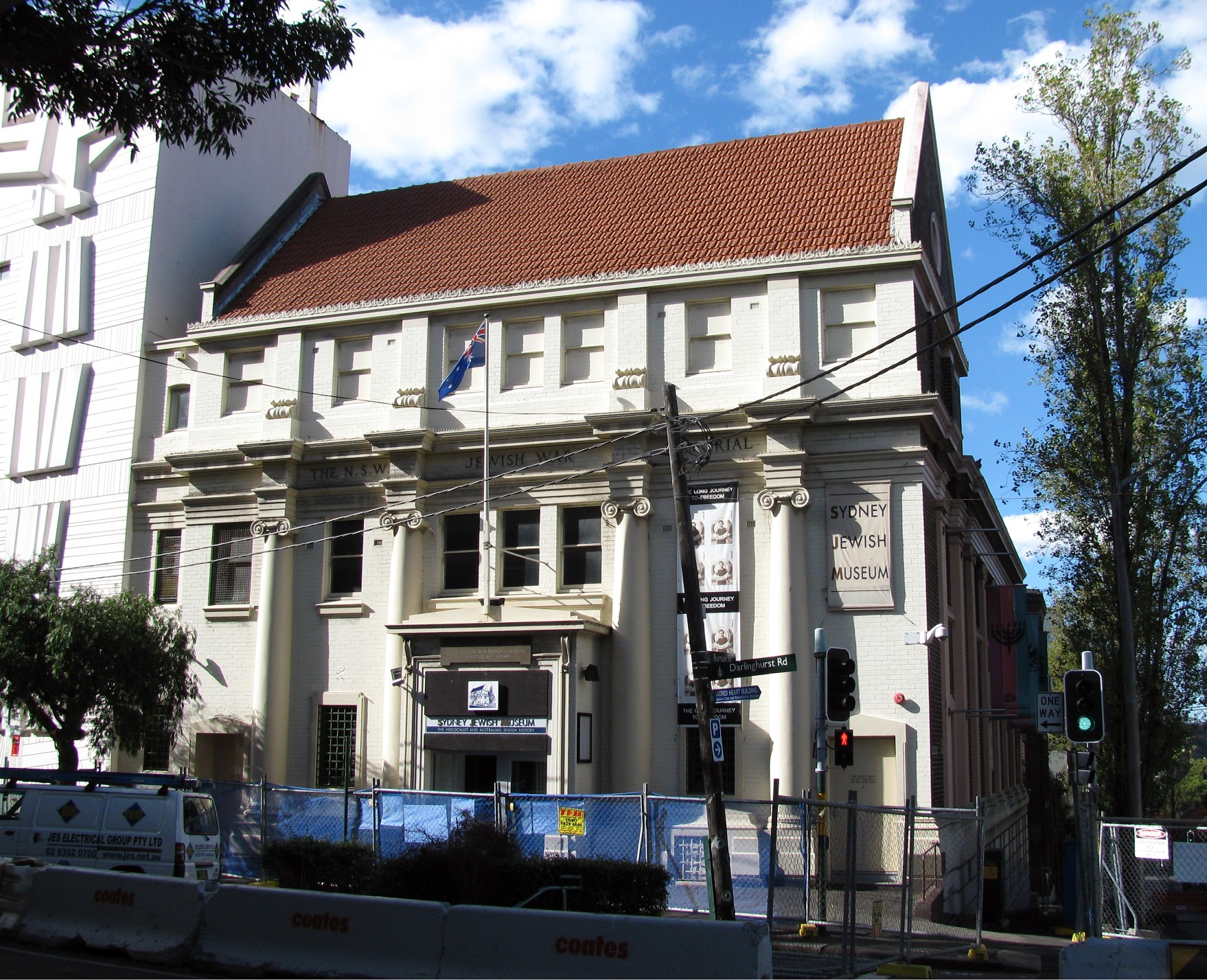
Sydney Jewish Museum

Darlinghurst has two of Sydney's museums: the Australian Museum (a natural history museum) and the Sydney Jewish Museum. The suburb also features St Vincent's Hospital, and is associated with the Sacred Heart Hospice on Darlinghurst Road, and the Garvan Institute of Medical Research.

=== Darlinghurst Gaol ===
Darlinghurst Gaol, the large sandstone penal complex in the middle of Darlinghurst was built between 1836 and 1840. The large sandstone walls still bear convict markings, and the complex features six wings surrounding a circular chapel. Australian poet Henry Lawson spent time incarcerated here during some of the turbulent years of his life. The last hanging at the jail was in 1907 (Jahn, 1997). The site became East Sydney Technical College in 1921, and in 1995 it became the National Art School.

=== Darlinghurst Fire Station ===
Darlinghurst Fire Station was completed in 1912, this three-storey brick and stone building occupies a prominent location at the corner of Darlinghurst Road and Victoria Street. It was designed in 1910 by Walter Liberty Vernon (Jahn, 1997). It still functions as a fire station and is listed on the Register of the National Estate.

=== Darlinghurst Courthouse ===
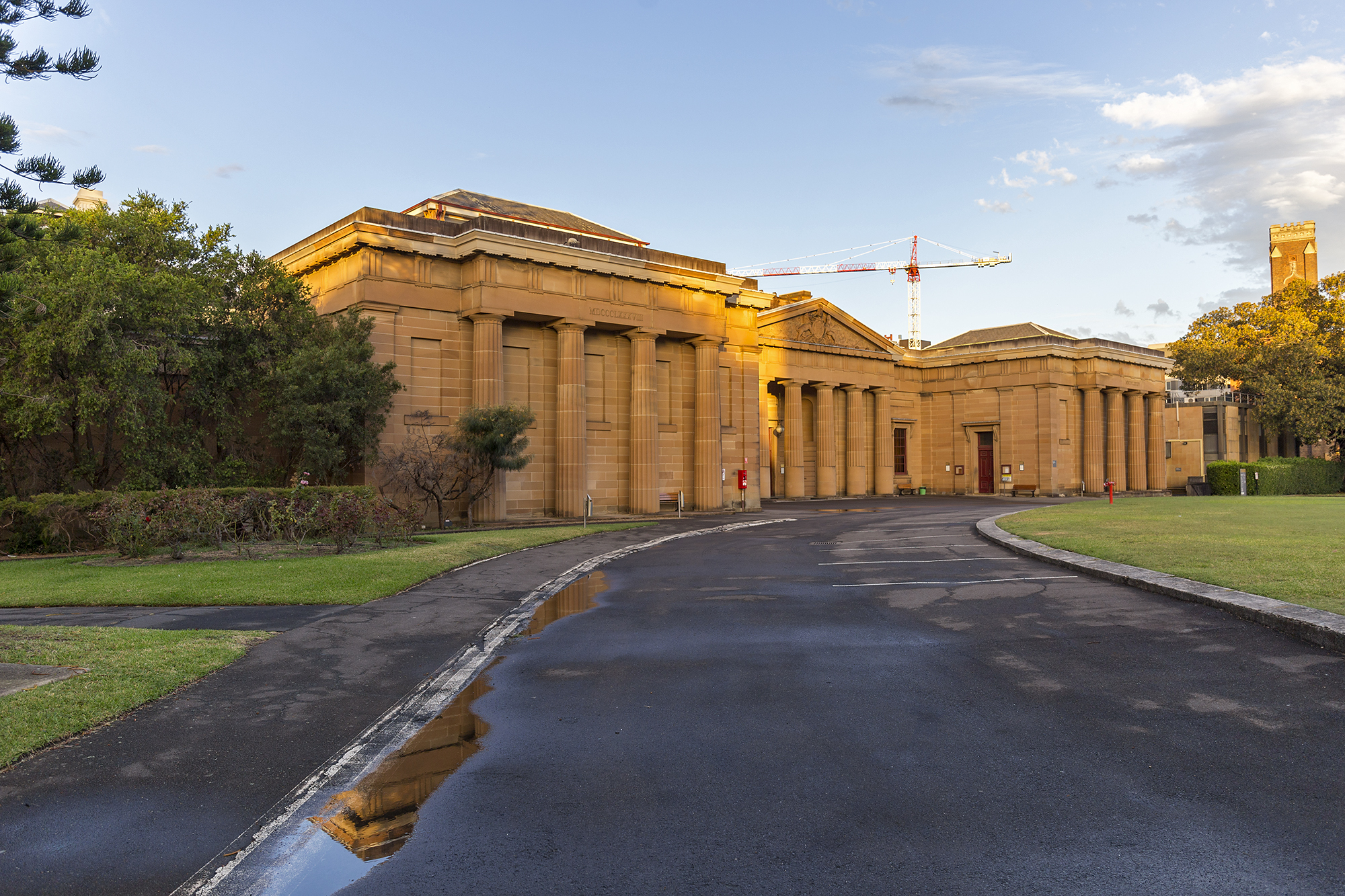
Darlinghurst Courthouse

Darlinghurst Courthouse is an imposing heritage-listed sandstone building on Taylor Square. It was designed by architect Mortimer Lewis in 1844, and has a Greek Revival style facade. The central block is adapted from an 1823 design in Peter Nicholson's The New Practical Builder (Apperly, Irving & Reynolds, 1989).

=== Oxford Street ===
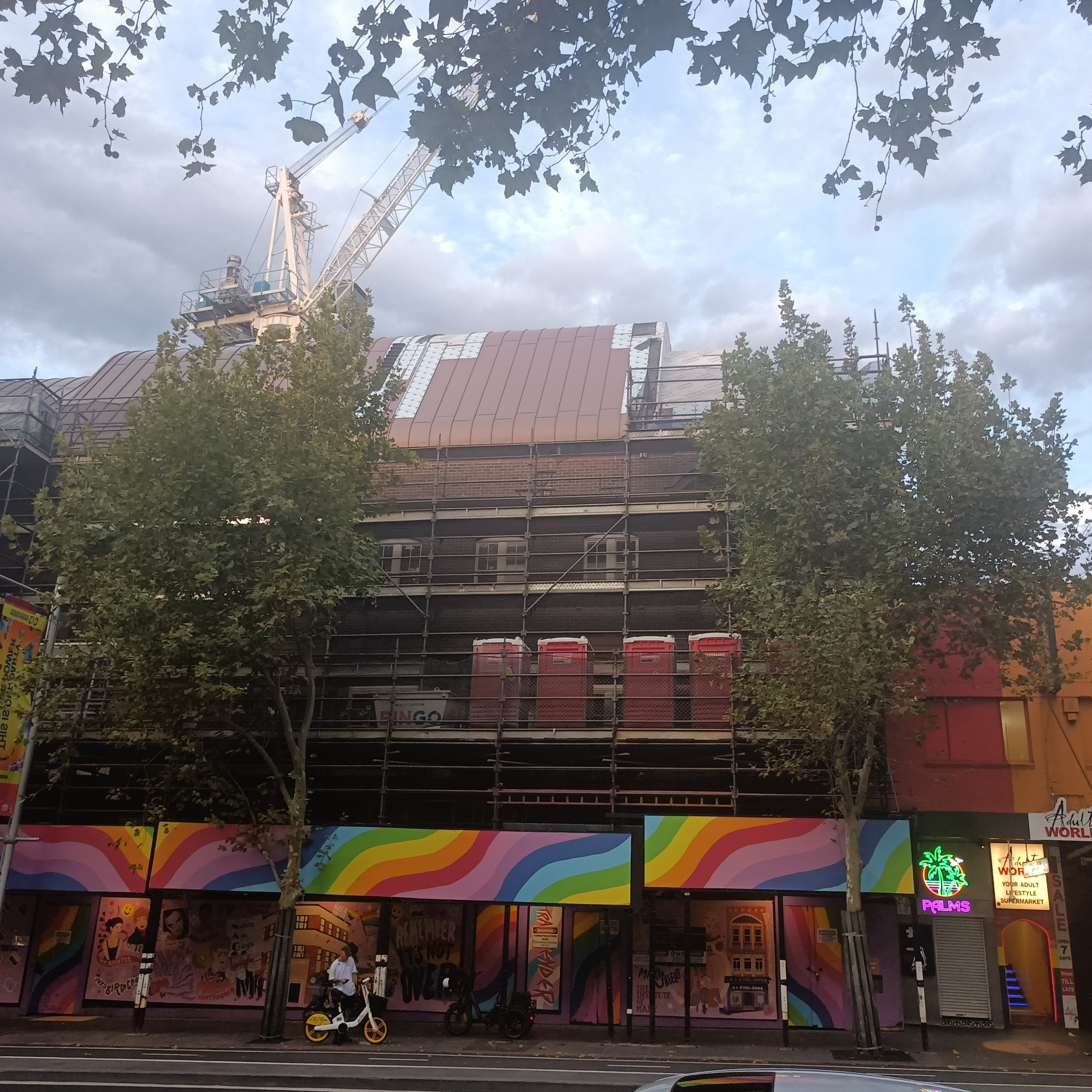
Construction hoardings along Oxford street installed in December 2022 in time for World Pride 2023 that was held in Sydney. The hoardings ran down the Darlinghurst section of Oxford street alongside the parade route of the Sydney Gay and Lesbian Mardi Gras parade and remained in place until around September 2025 when two thirds of them were removed. 2026

Oxford Street is the major commercial thoroughfare of Darlinghurst, running from the south-east corner of Hyde Park, through Taylor Square and beyond into Paddington, Woollahra and Bondi Junction, respectively. Oxford Street was originally called The South Head Road and work commenced on the road in 1811 (Faro, 2000). It was a toll road in its early years with the toll gates being located near present-day Glenmore Road. Oxford Street assumed its current name in 1875. Oxford Square is located at the intersection of Oxford and Burton Streets. Oxford Square is also the name of a small shopping centre located opposite, on the corner of Oxford and Riley Streets. Football Federation Australia have their head office at 1 Oxford Street.

Since 1978 the Darlinghurst section of Oxford st has been the annual route of the Sydney Gay and Lesbian Mardi Gras parade and since the mid '90s the parade has had an average of around 200,000 to 250,000 people vieweing it along the parade route with around 150 to 180 floats and around 10,000 to 12,00 participants in the parade per year.

The entire Mardi Gras festival, which runs for around 2 to 3 weeks in conjunction with the parade each year, has around 30,000 visitors who travel from outside Sydney to attend each year. The Mardi Gras festival "...includes more than 120 community events, dance parties, theatre and music". In 2023 when Sydney also hosted WorldPride the Mardi Gras festival had 310,000, people attend its events, which included large scale events such as the WorldPride opening ceremony in the Domain, Fair Day, the Mardi Gras after party and Bondi Beach party. In 2023 there were also 103,800 people who visited Sydney for the festival and 21,000 of those people were international visitors.

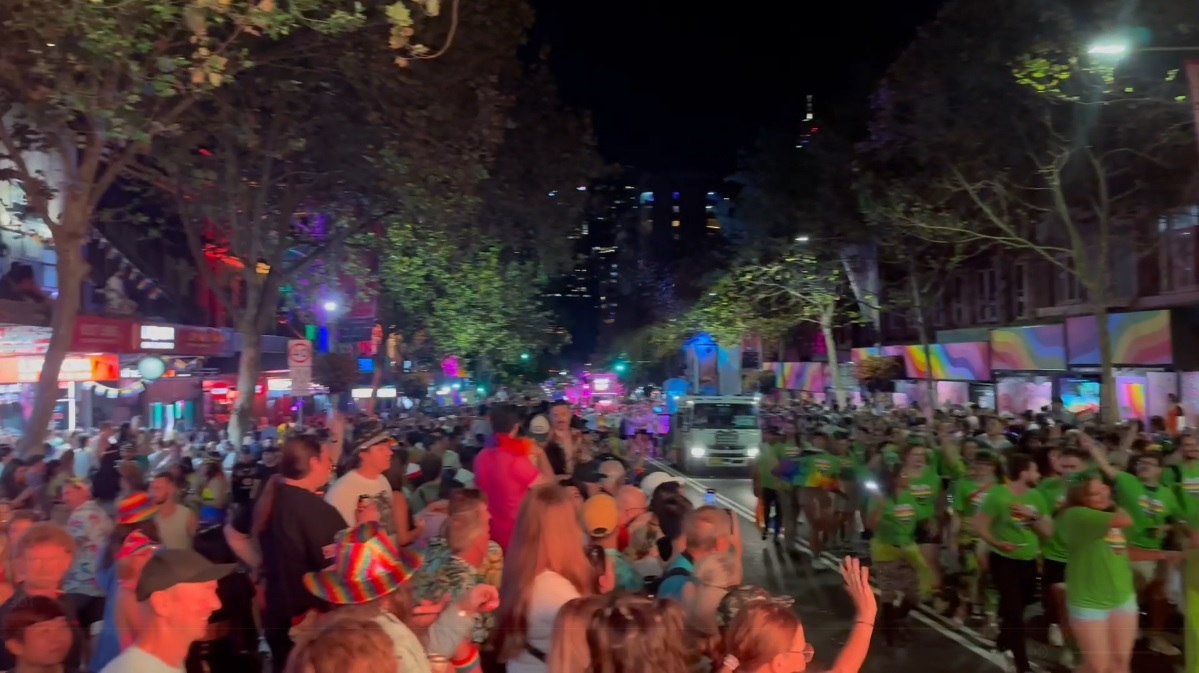
Since the Mid 90's crowds at the Mardi Gras parade have averaged between 200,000 to 250,000 people. 2023.

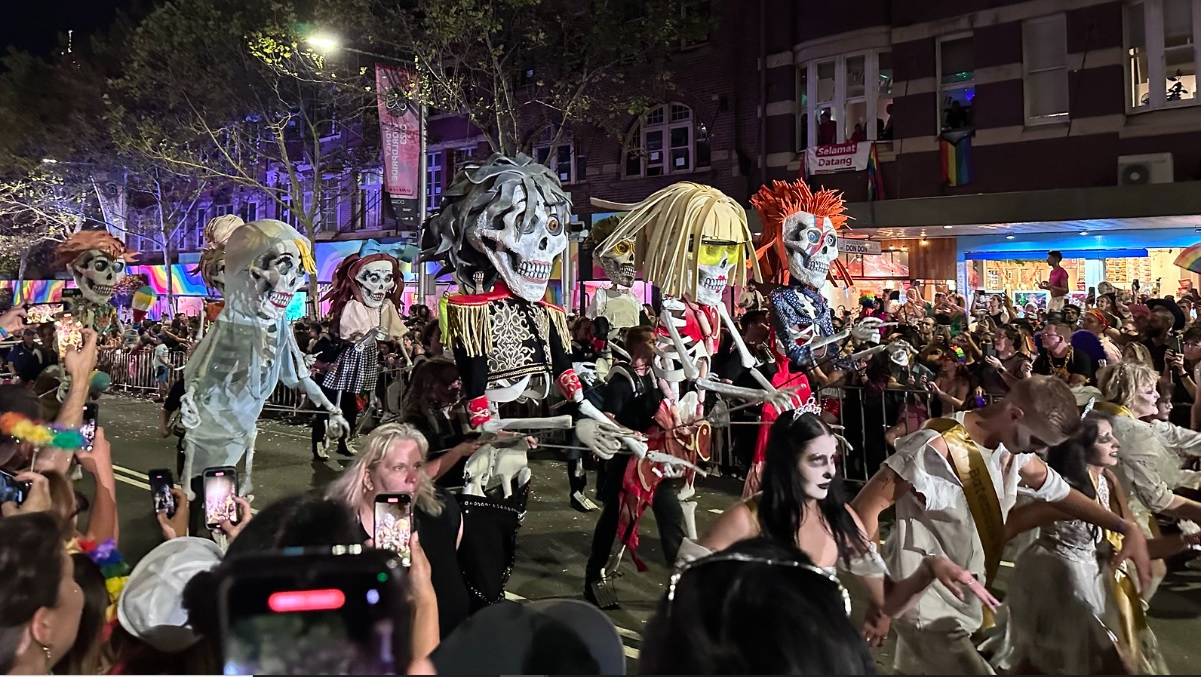
Since 1978 the parade route of the Mardi Gras parade has gone down the Darlinghurst section of Oxford st. A float in the parade during Sydey WorldPride 2023.

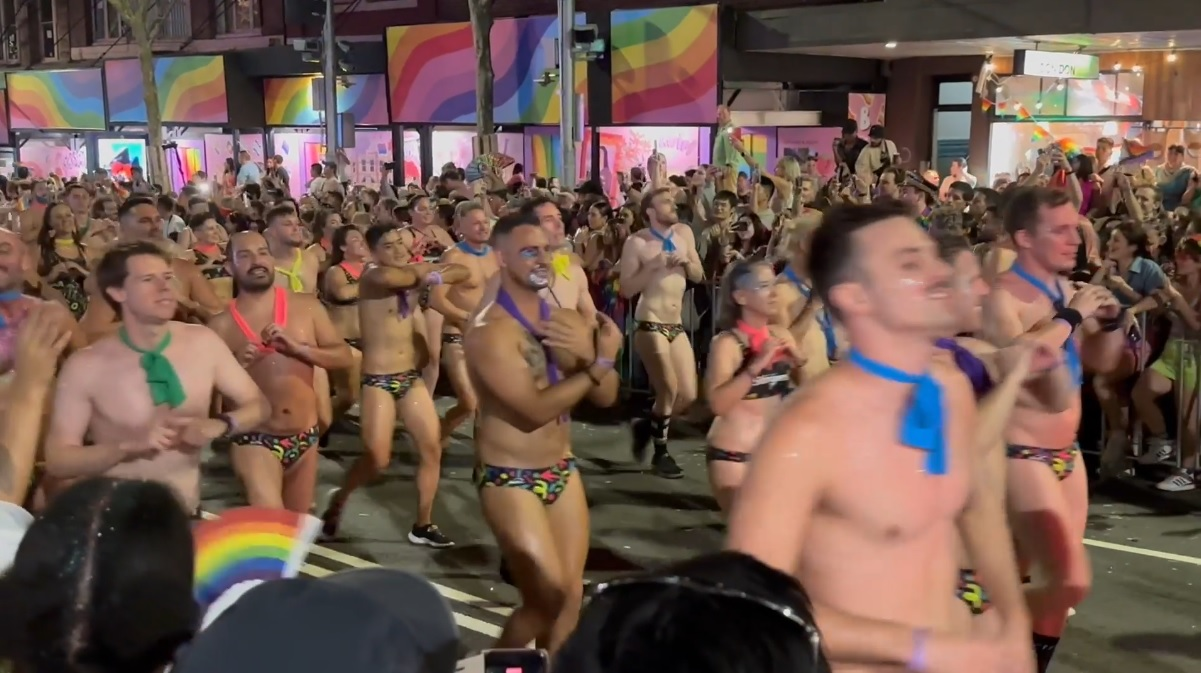
People participating in the Mardi Gras Parade. 2023.

=== Stanley Street ===
Stanley Street is one of the suburb's two secondary restaurant strips (with Victoria Street) and is often referred to as Sydney's first "Little Italy". However, the restaurants range from Japanese, Thai and Italian and the prices range from basic to moderate. There is an annual Italian Festival held here every June.

=== Victoria Street ===
Victoria Street is the other major cafe strip. Restaurants range from basic to upmarket. The majority of the cafes have outdoor seating. Several iconic restaurants are in this area, such as Tropicana and Bar Coluzzi.

=== Inter-War apartments ===
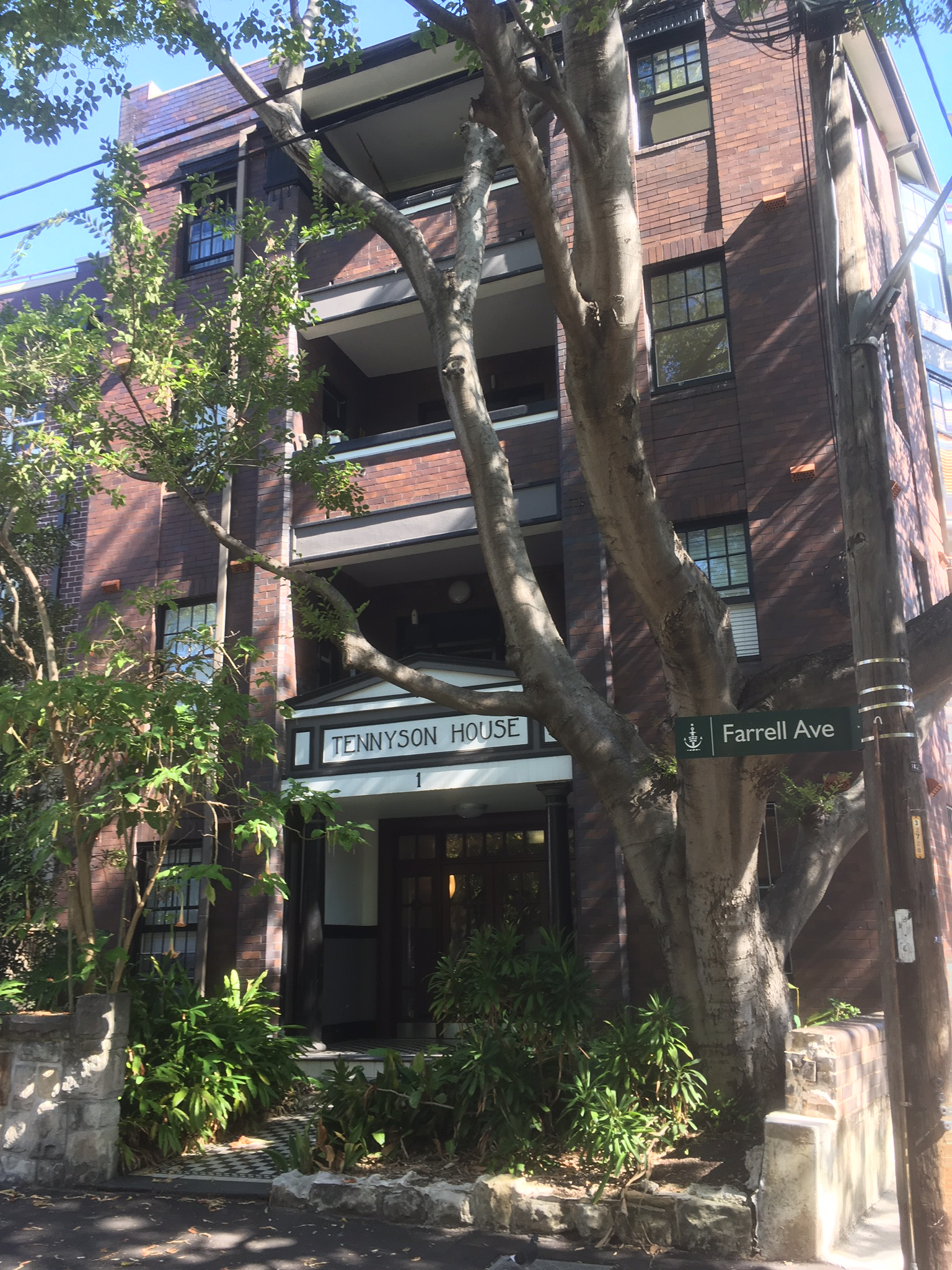
Tennyson House

- Ballina, 3–5 Darley Street
- Claridge, 28–30 Flinders Street
- Greencourt, 1 Darley Street (1919)
- Hillcrest, 114 Burton Street
- Kurrajong, 138 Darlinghurst Road
- Mont Clair, 347 Liverpool Street
- Portree, 2a Darley Street
- Royal Court, 227 Crown Street
- Tennyson House, 1 Farrell Avenue designed by Claud Hamilton 1924
- The Rutland, 381 Liverpool Street
- The Savoy, 2–10 Hardy Street designed by Claud Hamilton 1919

=== The Horizon ===
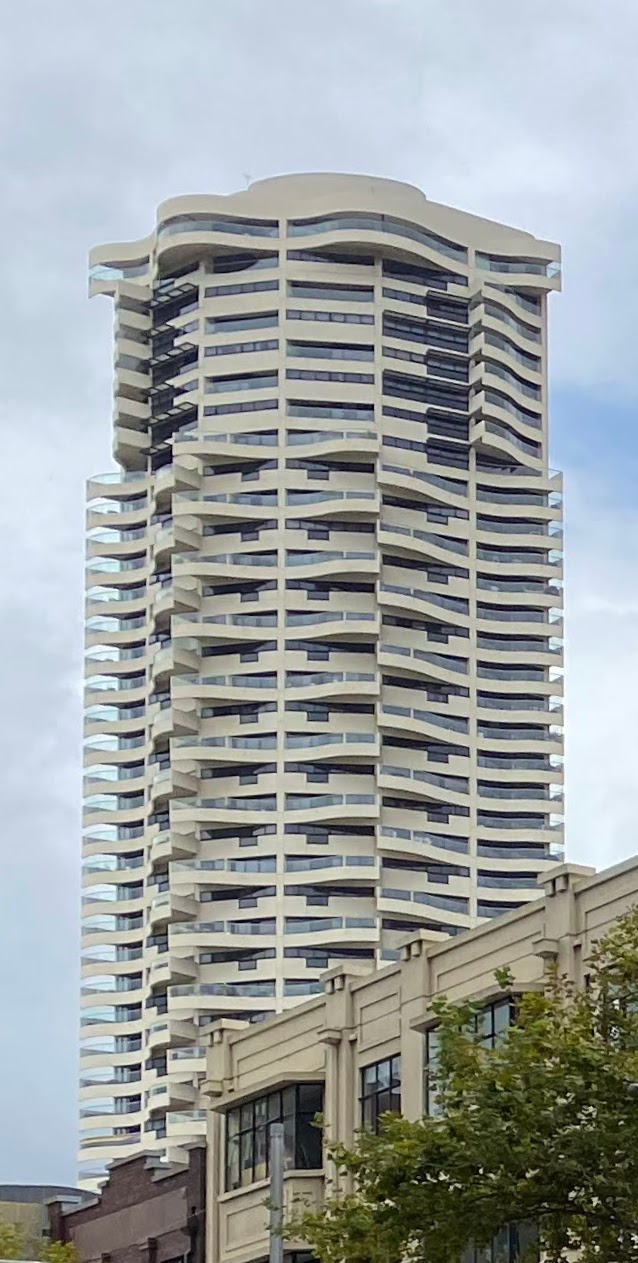
Horizon Apartments

The Horizon, located in Forbes Street, Darlinghurst, is a 43-storey residential high-rise building completed in 1998. It has a distinctive scalloped facade and is finished in rendered concrete. The building was designed by Sydney architect Harry Seidler and is controversial in that it was one of the first high-rise buildings constructed in the predominately low rise area, with critics saying it caused overshadowing of the surrounding area. The Horizon apartments consist of a residential tower and two lower buildings of apartments, 6 levels of car parks, swimming pool, a tennis court, gym and surrounding gardens.

== Demographics ==
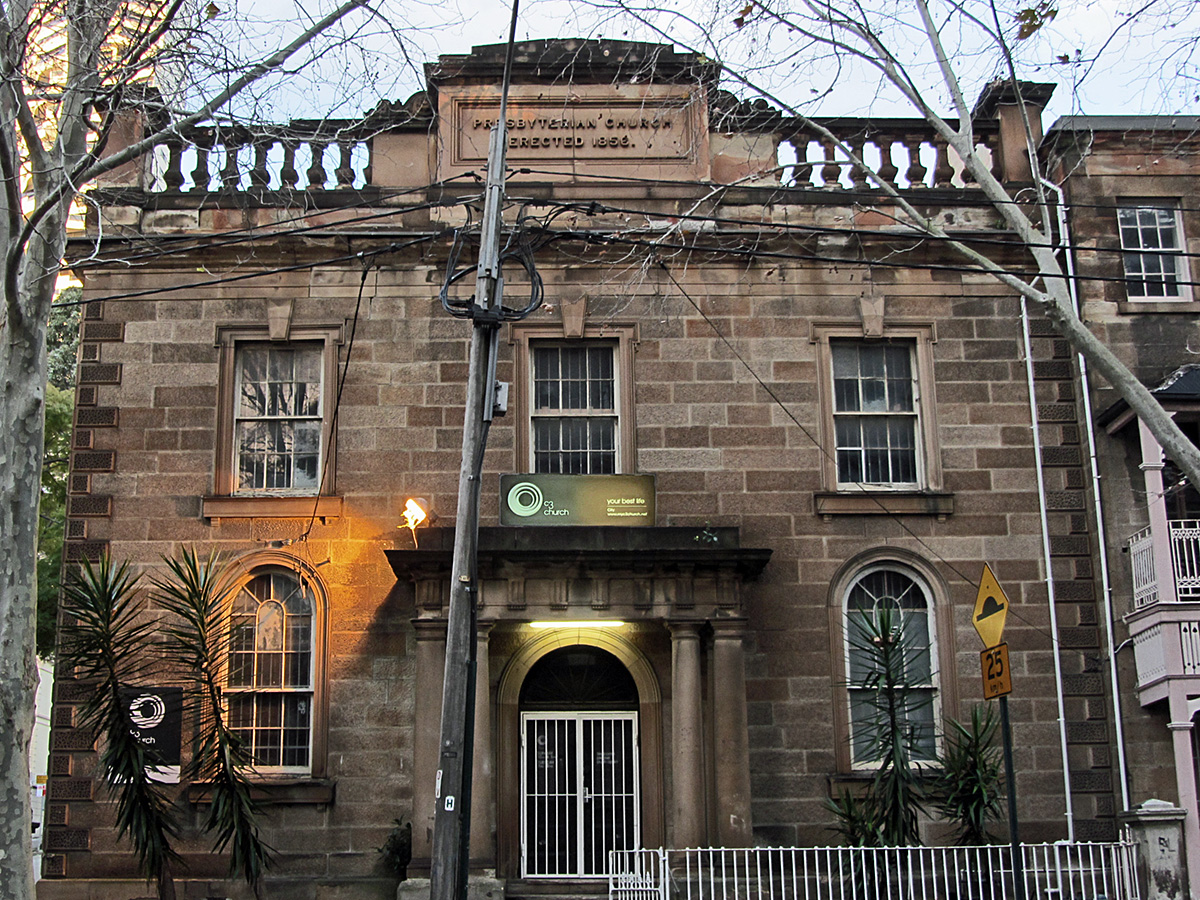
Former Presbyterian Church (1850)

At the 2021 census, the population of Darlinghurst was 10,615. 57.9% of people were male and 42.1% female. This was a higher rate of male residents than the national average of 49.3%. In Darlinghurst, 52.7% of people were born in Australia. The most common other countries of birth were England 6.3%, New Zealand 4.0%, Thailand 2.1%, United States of America 2.0% and China 1.6%. 71.8% of people only spoke English at home. Other languages spoken at home included Spanish 2.5%, Thai 2.0%, Mandarin 1.9%, Italian 1.2% and French 1.2%. The most common response for religion was No Religion at 54.3%. Of occupied private dwellings in Darlinghurst, 78.8% were flats or apartments and 19.6% were semi-detached, row or terrace houses, townhouses etc. Just 0.9% of dwellings were separate houses, compared to the national average of 72.2%.

== Commercial area ==
Darlinghurst's commercial activity is centred on Oxford Street, and extends to Victoria Street, Flinders Street, Crown Street, William Street, and Darlinghurst Road. There are a large number of cafés, restaurants and take-away food stores throughout Darlinghurst, as well as a large number of pubs and nightclubs, many of which are on Oxford Street. These pubs and clubs were subject to controversial 'lock-out' laws imposed by the Liberal state government in February 2014, in which venues stopped admitting new customers after 01:30, and ceased the service of alcohol between 03:00 and 05:00. These laws were introduced as a response to violence in the Inner City of Sydney that was related to alcohol intoxication. The lockout laws were repealed in January 2020 with a focus on small bars over big nightclubs. There is also a significant retail presence, including fashion retailers.

== Transport ==
Darlinghurst is well-served by lots of forms of public transport, with many bus routes from the Eastern Suburbs converging on Oxford Street prior to entering the Sydney central business district. Route 333 between Circular Quay and Bondi Beach travels through Darlinghurst along Oxford Street. Routes 352, 373, 396 and 440 also travel through the suburb on Oxford Street. Buses that travel through the centre of Darlinghurst are routes 311 and 389.

There are no train stations in Darlinghurst, however Kings Cross railway station on the Sydney Trains Eastern Suburbs & Illawarra railway line is just over the northern border of the suburb. Museum station on the City Circle, is located just to the west of Darlinghurst, on the south-west corner of Hyde Park.

== Schools ==
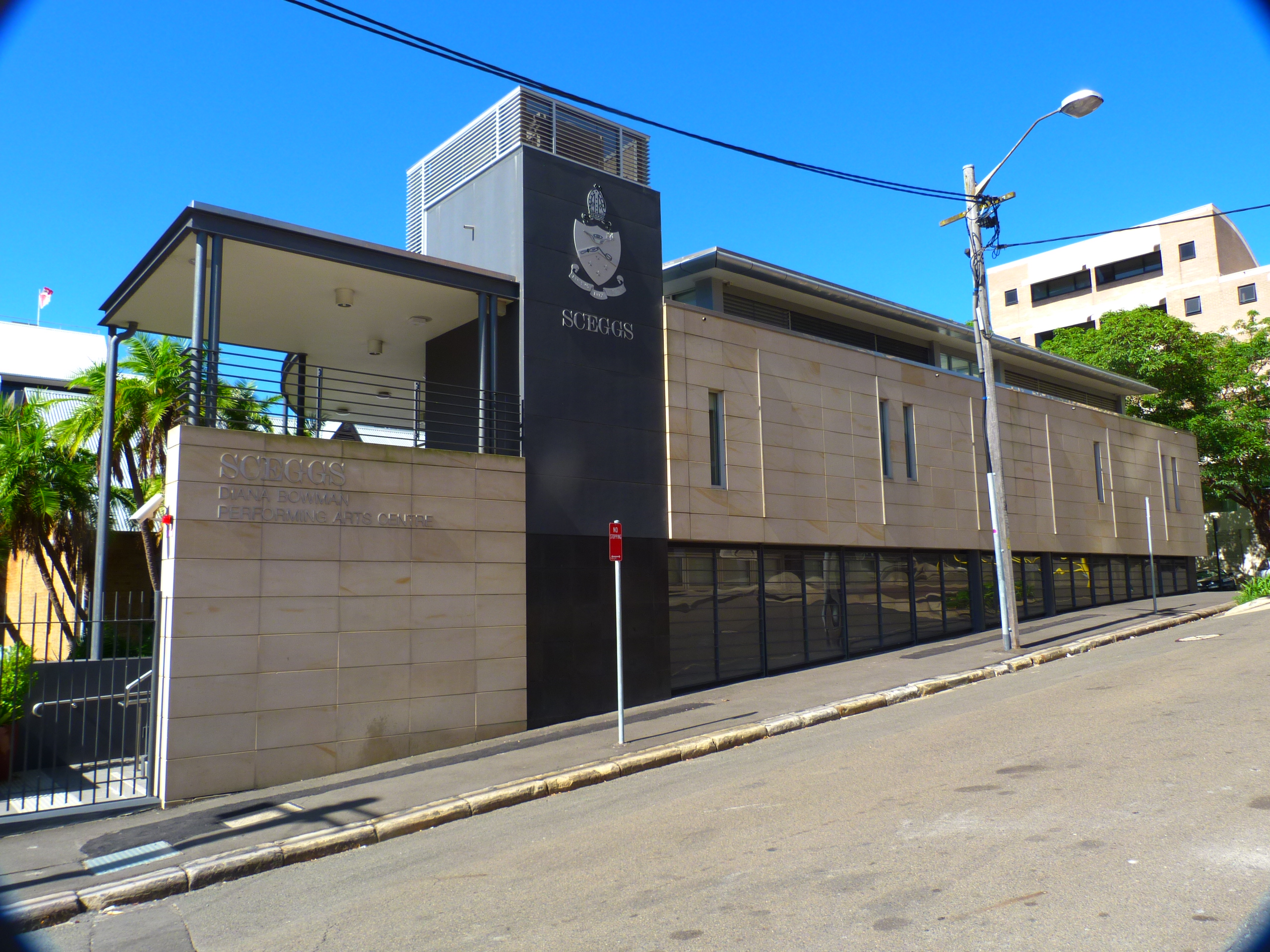
Diana Bowman Performing Arts Centre (SCEGGS)

Darlinghurst Public School, located on the corner of Liverpool Street and Womerah Avenue, was opened in 1884. It teaches both boys and girl students from Kindergarten to Year 6 grade. Sydney Grammar School is located on College Street, across the road from Hyde Park and is a boys-only private school which opened in 1857.

The Sydney Church of England Girls' Grammar School (now called SCEGGS Darlinghurst) was founded in 1895 in Victoria Street, Darlinghurst. It moved to its current site in Forbes Street, in 1901. The former Marist Brothers High School at 280–296 Liverpool Street is now an apartment complex named Alexandra. The school occupied this site from 1911 until 1968 when it moved to Marist College Canberra.

The National Art School of Australia is a specialist art school that started in collaboration with Sydney TAFE which dates back to 1859. It is now an independent tertiary education provider allowing students to take courses in Fine Art as well offering short courses to the public. It is located on the former site of the Darlinghurst Gaol and has a gallery which runs art exhibitions throughout the year showing work from students as well as artists from around the world.

The University of Notre Dame's School of Medicine and the School of Nursing are located in the historic parish buildings associated with the Sacred Heart Parish in Darlinghurst. The complex includes facilities for use by medical and nursing students such as simulated wards, practise wet laboratories and clinical skills laboratories in addition to simulated consulting rooms.

=== Early learning ===
Early learning providers in Darlinghust include:

- East Sydney Early Learning (Goodstart Early Learning)
- Darlo Play Centre

==== Goodstart Early Learning ====
On 26 November 2026, Goodstart Early Learning announced plans to shut Darlinghurst service, receiving national coverage. It blamed high costs, stating it was making a significant loss despite high occupancy. The federal government rejected its request to raise its fees beyond a cap of $175 per day. The City of Sydney's approved rent for Goodstart was $357,230.49 in FY26.

This prompted the community to start a petition.. The City of Sydney offered the provider 12 months free rent, which Clover Moore hoped would give comfort, stability and certainty to parents. Zann Maxwell stated there was demand for the centre but Goodstart had given "mixed messages" on the closure. By 22 August the provider had yet to confirm whether it had accepted the offer. Goodstart pays teachers on par with state primary schools and by FY2025 operated 677 early learning centres in Australia.

On 24 August the City of Sydney resolved the petition be received and noted. By 28 August, Goodstart responded to the City of Sydney's offer of 12 month free rent with a request for 5 years free rent, funding for building upgrades, and rent reductions at three other locations. The council encouraged Goodstart to accept the initial offer. On 5 September 2026, the petition organiser stated the centre would remain open and the campaign had succeeded and a joint post was made by Save Darlo Early Learning, Sylvie Ellsmore, Zann Maxwell (Deputy Lord Mayor of Sydney), Allegra Spender, and Georgie Dent.

== Churches ==
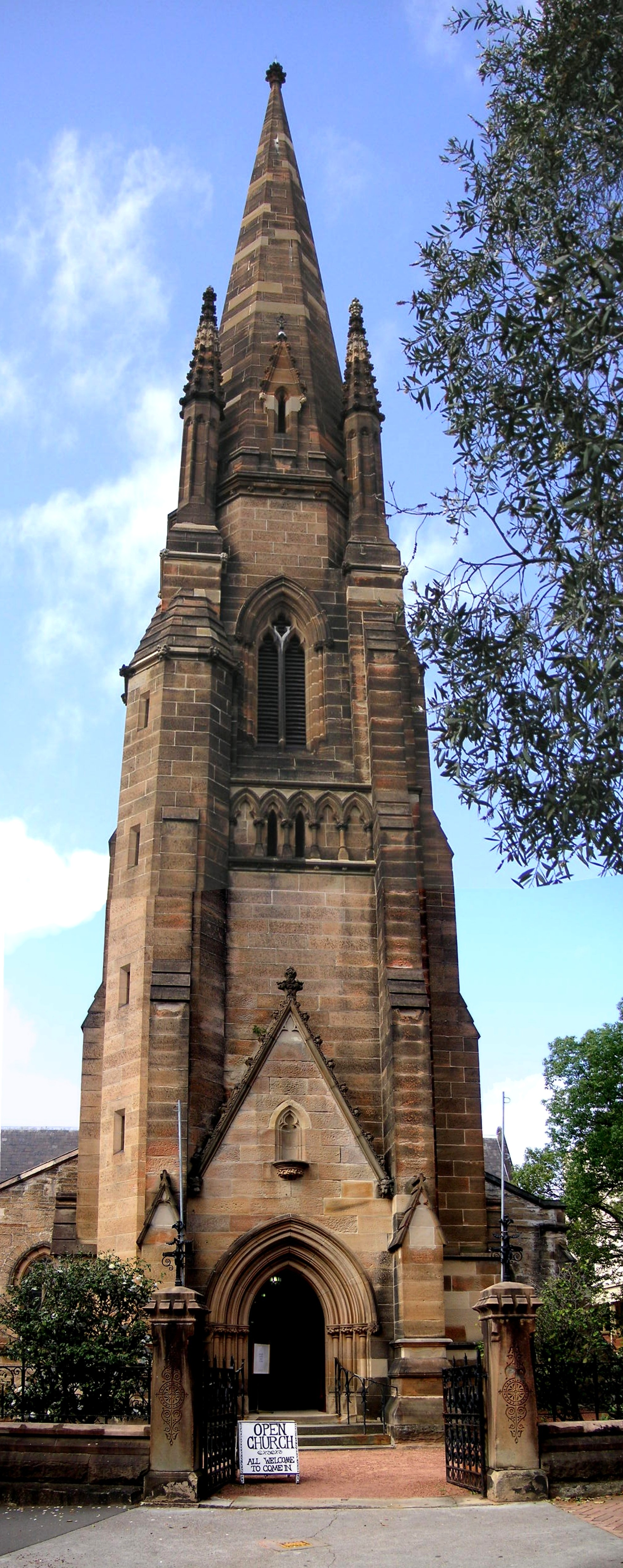
St John's Church of England

Darlinghurst has four functioning churches:

- God in the city, an Assemblies of God congregation affiliated with Christian City Churches
- St. Pauls Lutheran Church congregation (Sydney Lutheran Parish)
- St John's, an Anglican congregation. St John's operates Rough Edges, a street outreach centre that functions as a cafe and drop-in centre. It provides a range of services to the local community, including the homeless.
- Sacred Heart Catholic Church is on the corner of Darlinghurst Road and Oxford Street.

There are also a number of other religious organisations in the suburb, including a variety of smaller chapels and religious services attached to St Vincent's Hospital.

The heritage listed building which previously housed the First Church of Christ Scientist Sydney is now known as Yirranma Place. It's been repurposed as a work hub for the Paul Ramsay Foundation and other nonprofit organisations.

The former St Peter's Church, Darlinghurst, in Bourke Street is now part of SCEGGS Darlinghurst and is known as The Great Hall. The former rectory in Forbes Street is now a private residence.

== Politics ==
The area has often been a battleground between the two councils of the City of Sydney and the City of South Sydney. Most of the suburb belonged to South Sydney, however the New South Wales State Government moved the borders repeatedly in order to change the make-up of the City of Sydney. Many claim that these shifts have been attempted to shift the balance of power in the favour of the party in control of the State Government, though some residents of Darlinghurst and Potts Point (the former North Ward of the City of South Sydney) felt that the postcodes of 2010 (Darlinghurst and Surry Hills) and 2011 (Elizabeth Bay, Kings Cross, Rushcutters Bay, Woolloomooloo and Potts Point) were relatively neglected by the City of South Sydney.

However, this battle is now moot since both councils were forced by the State Government to amalgamate in February 2004. An election was held on Saturday, 27 March 2004, in order to elect a new council for the redesignated (expanded) City of Sydney. Critics of the amalgamation have claimed that the election demonstrated strong voter backlash against the State Government for pressing the issue. The Australian Labor Party, for whom the area was usually safe, had their primary vote reduced to approximately 20%. The independent Clover Moore took the Lord Mayoral position, having campaigned against the Government's dismissal of the council.

At a federal level, Darlinghurst falls in the electorates of the Division of Sydney and Wentworth. Its current parliamentary representatives are Tanya Plibersek (Labor) and Allegra Spender (Independent). These electorates have some of the state's strongest support for The Greens.

== Heritage listings ==
=== New South Wales State Heritage Register ===
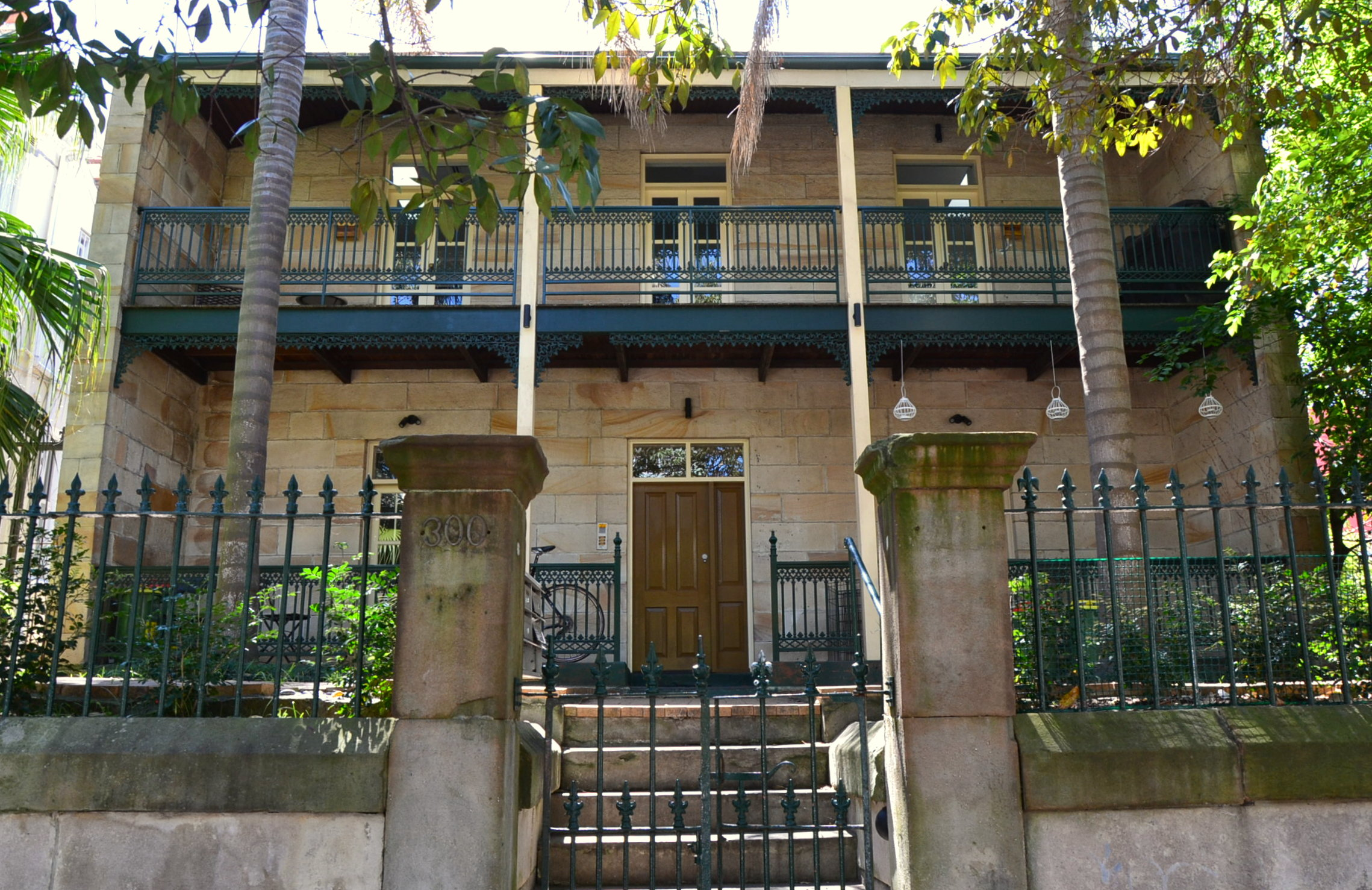
The Grange, Liverpool Street

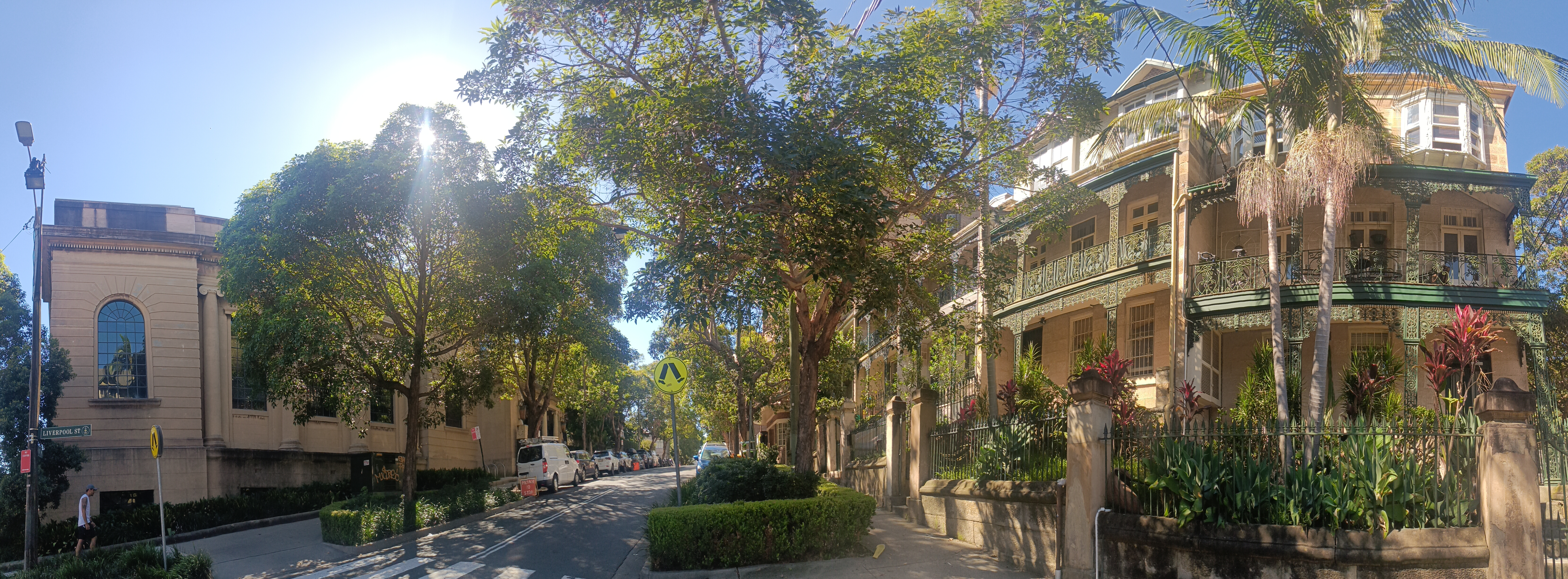
A group of terrace houses at 337- 345 Liverpool street and Yirranma place.

Darlinghurst has a number of heritage-listed sites, including the following sites listed on the New South Wales State Heritage Register:

- Bourke Street: St Peter's Church
- 348a Bourke Street: Bourke Street Wesleyan Chapel
- 411a Bourke Street: St Sophia Greek Orthodox Church, formerly the Bourke Street Congregational Church and School
- 1 Darley Street: Stoneleigh (a former home of Phillip Adams)
- 2 Darley Street: Iona
- 120 Darlinghurst Road: St John's Anglican Church
- 56 Oxford Street: G. A. Zink and Sons Building
- Taylor Square: Darlinghurst Courthouse
- intersection of Taylor Square, Oxford, Forbes and Bourke Street: Taylor Square Substation No. 6 and Underground Conveniences
- 101–115 William Street: William House

=== Register of the National Estate (defunct register) ===
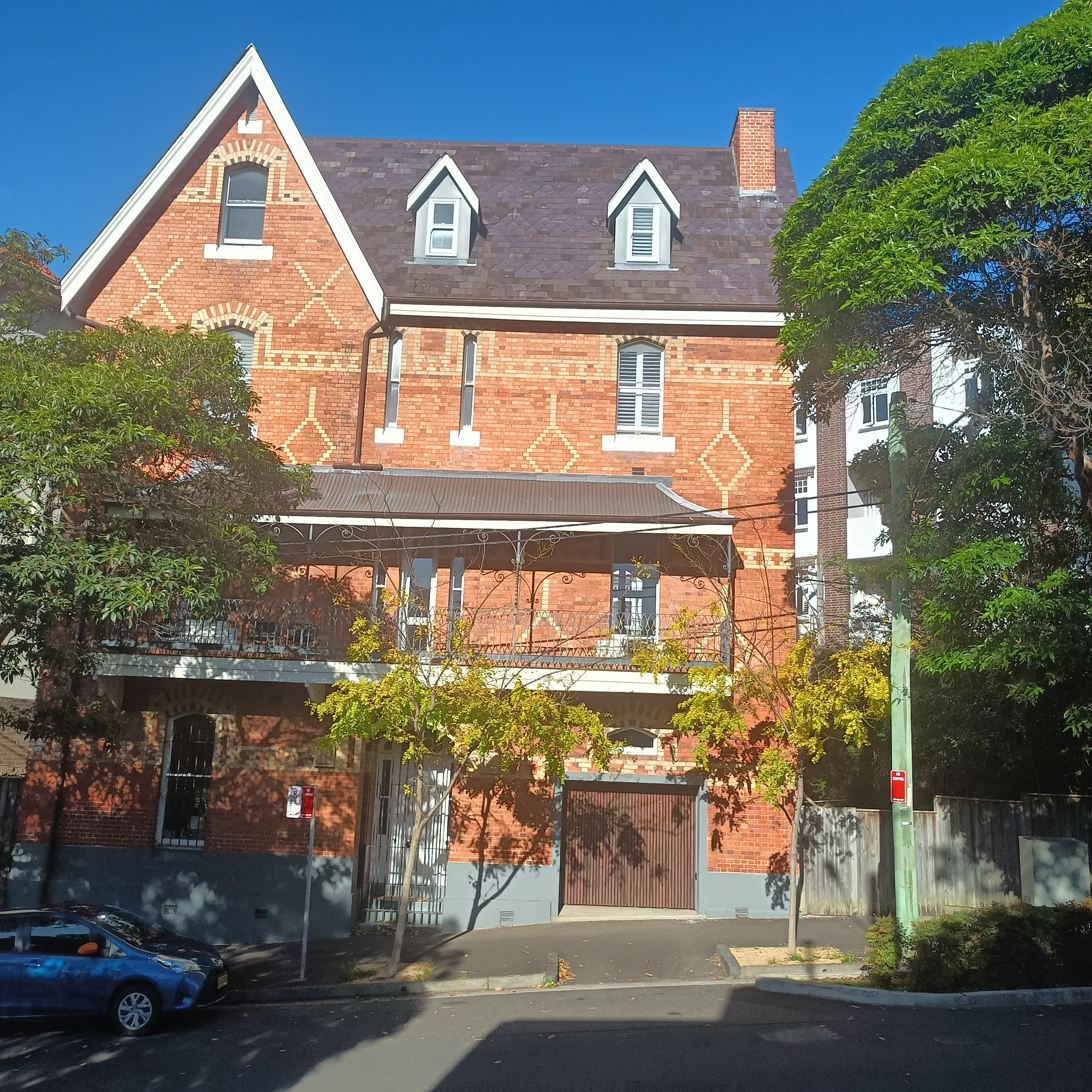
A former rectory built in 1872 that is now a residential building at 188 Forbes St. 2026

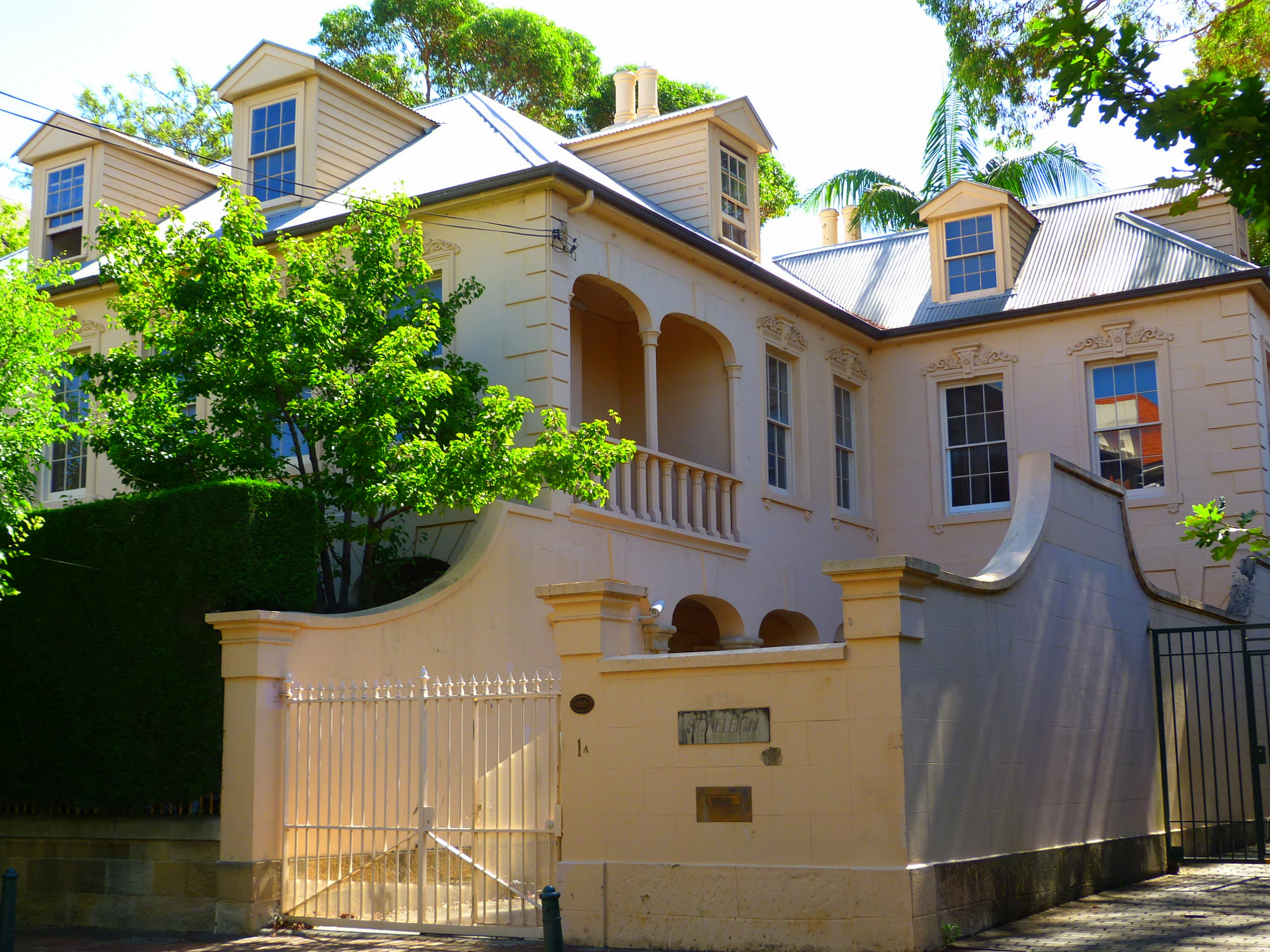
Stoneleigh, Darley Street

The following buildings are listed on the now defunct Register of the National Estate:

- 150–152 Bourke Street: St Peters Anglican Church (former)
- Bourke Street: Darlinghurst Police Station and Residence
- Burton Street: Oxford Square Group
- 20 Burton Street: Family Hotel (former)
- Caldwell Street: Beares Stairs
- 1 William St: Australian Museum
- 10–12 College Street: Sydney Grammar School
- Darley Street: Darley Street Group
- 1A Darley Street: Stoneleigh
- 2 Darley Street: Iona
- 120 Darlinghurst Road: St Johns Anglican Church Group and St Johns Rectory
- 96–102 Darlinghurst Road: Darlinghurst Fire Station
- 892b Darlinghurst Road: Darlinghurst Gaol (former)
- Flinders Street: Flinders Street Group
- 82–156 Flinders Street: Terraces and Townhouses
- 188 Forbes Street: St Peters Rectory (former)
- 215 Forbes Street: Barham (excluding later additions)
- 238–252 Forbes St: Belgrave Terrace (former)
- 204–218 Liverpool Street: Terrace
- 278 Liverpool Street: Hilton
- 280 Liverpool Street: Marist Brothers High School (former)
- 298 Liverpool Street: Novar
- 300 Liverpool Street: The Grange (former home of William Hardy Wilson)
- 337–345 Liverpool Street: Liverpool Street Group
- Oxford Street: Busbys Bore or The Tunnel
- 10–20 Oxford Square: SILF Company Building
- 52–54 Oxford Street: ANZ Bank (former)
- 56 Oxford Street: G. A. Zink and Sons Building
- 136 Oxford Street: Darlinghurst Courthouse
- 186–186A Palmer Street: Uniting Church group
- 130 Womerah Avenue: Family Hotel (former)

== Culture ==
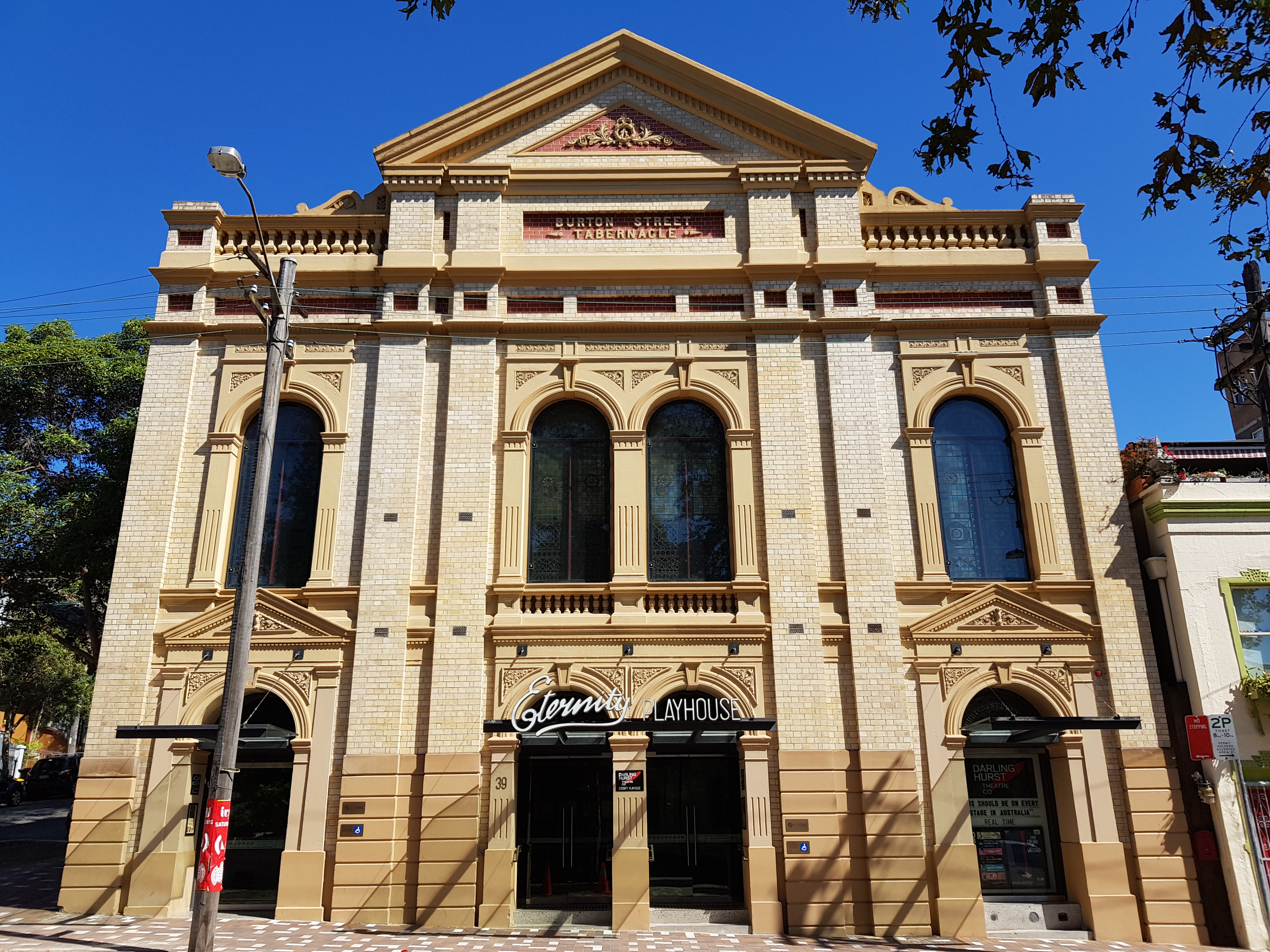
Eternity Playhouse, Burton Street

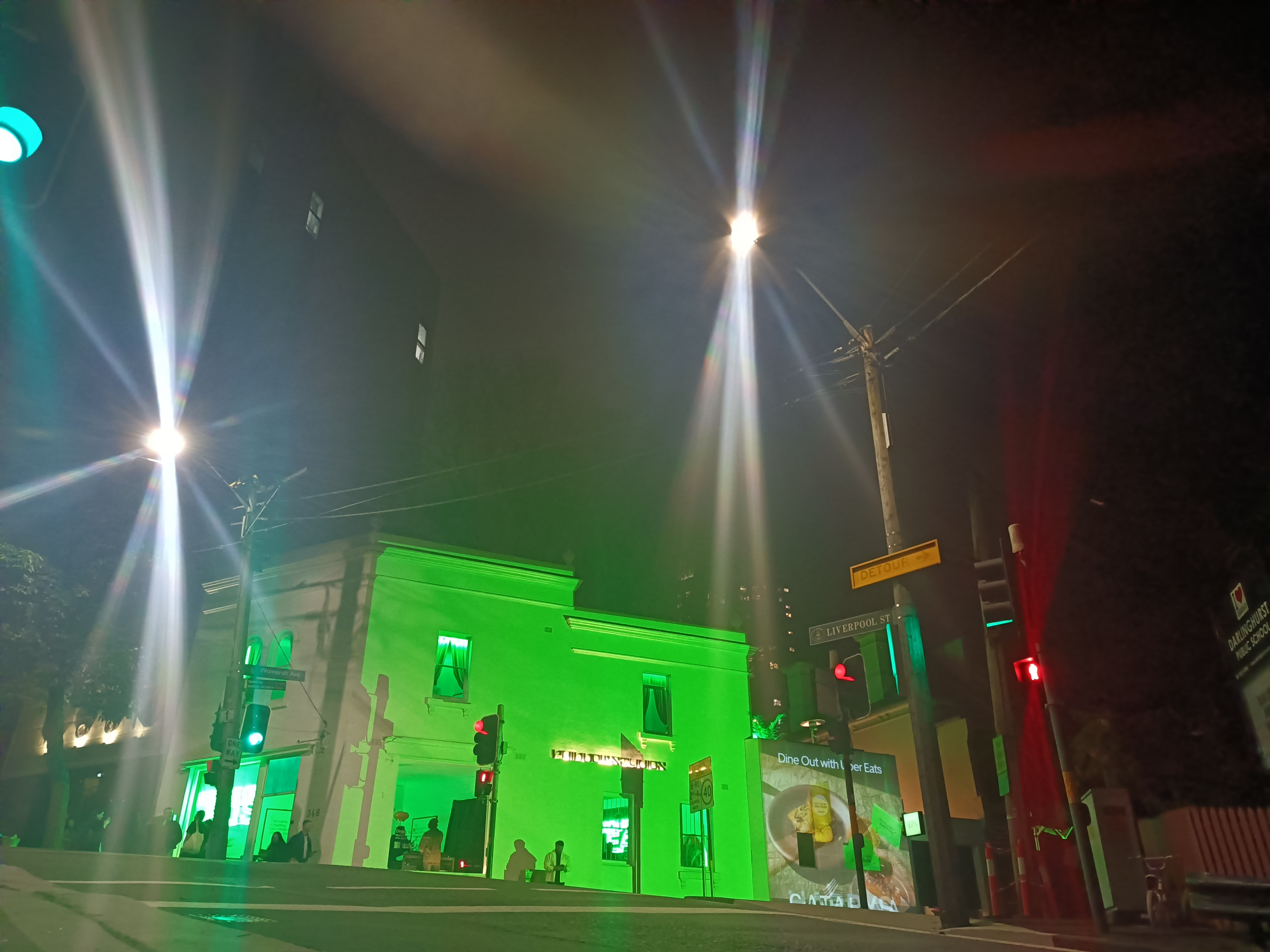
Rainbow studios art gallery, Liverpool St., Darlinghurst. 2025

The Darlinghurst area is famous for the annual Sydney Gay and Lesbian Mardi Gras. The parade, first held in 1978 as a protest march by members of the gay and lesbian community, marks the end of a three-week festival and takes place on Oxford Street, the main street that runs through several suburbs, including Darlinghurst.

The Sydney Jewish Museum is on the corner of Darlinghurst Road and Burton Street (148 Darlinghurst Rd) and features exhibitions about the Jewish community in Sydney.

There are many small private art galleries in Darlinghurst, including Black Eye Gallery (Darlinghurst Road; photography), King Street Gallery on William (William Street; painting), Conny Dietzschold Gallery (Crown Street; contemporary art), Stanley Street Gallery (Stanley Street; contemporary art), Robin Gibson (Liverpool Street; painting, sculpture), Gallery 9 (Darley Street; contemporary art) and Liverpool Street Gallery (Liverpool Street; contemporary art). Entry to these galleries is free, and most of the exhibitions will display the work of Australian artists.

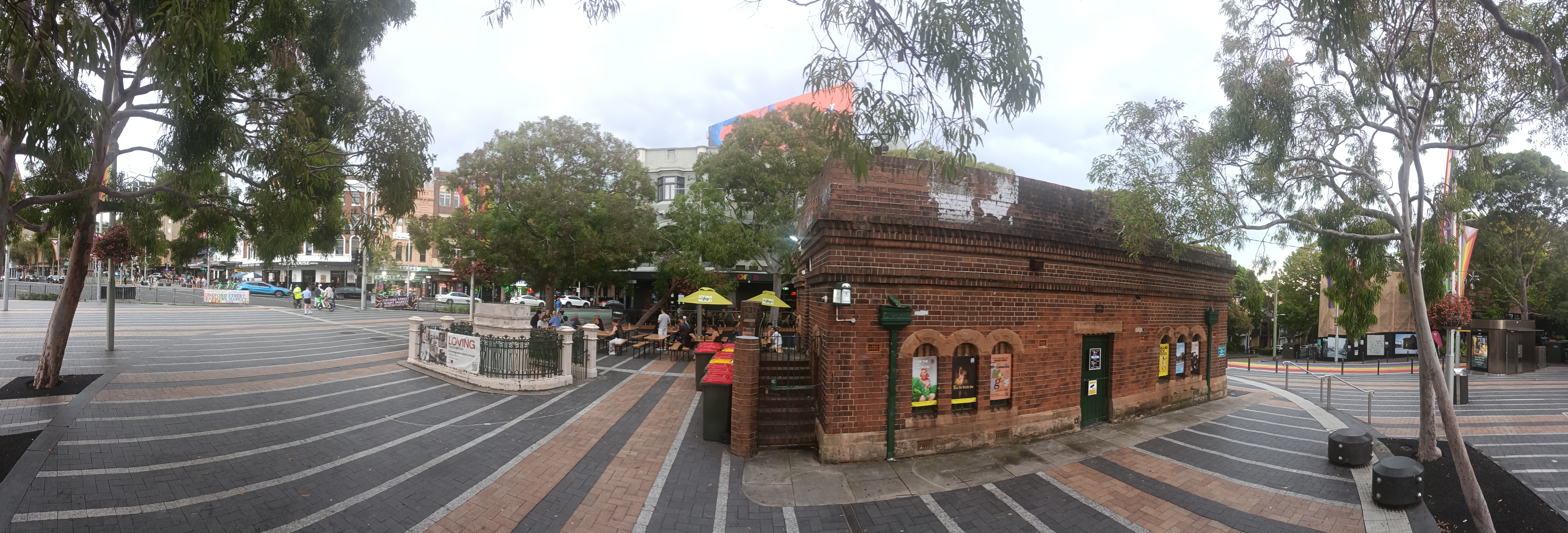
The substation and the toilet block at the northern end of Taylor Square are used by Qtopia for exhibitions and performances related to queer stories in Sydney.

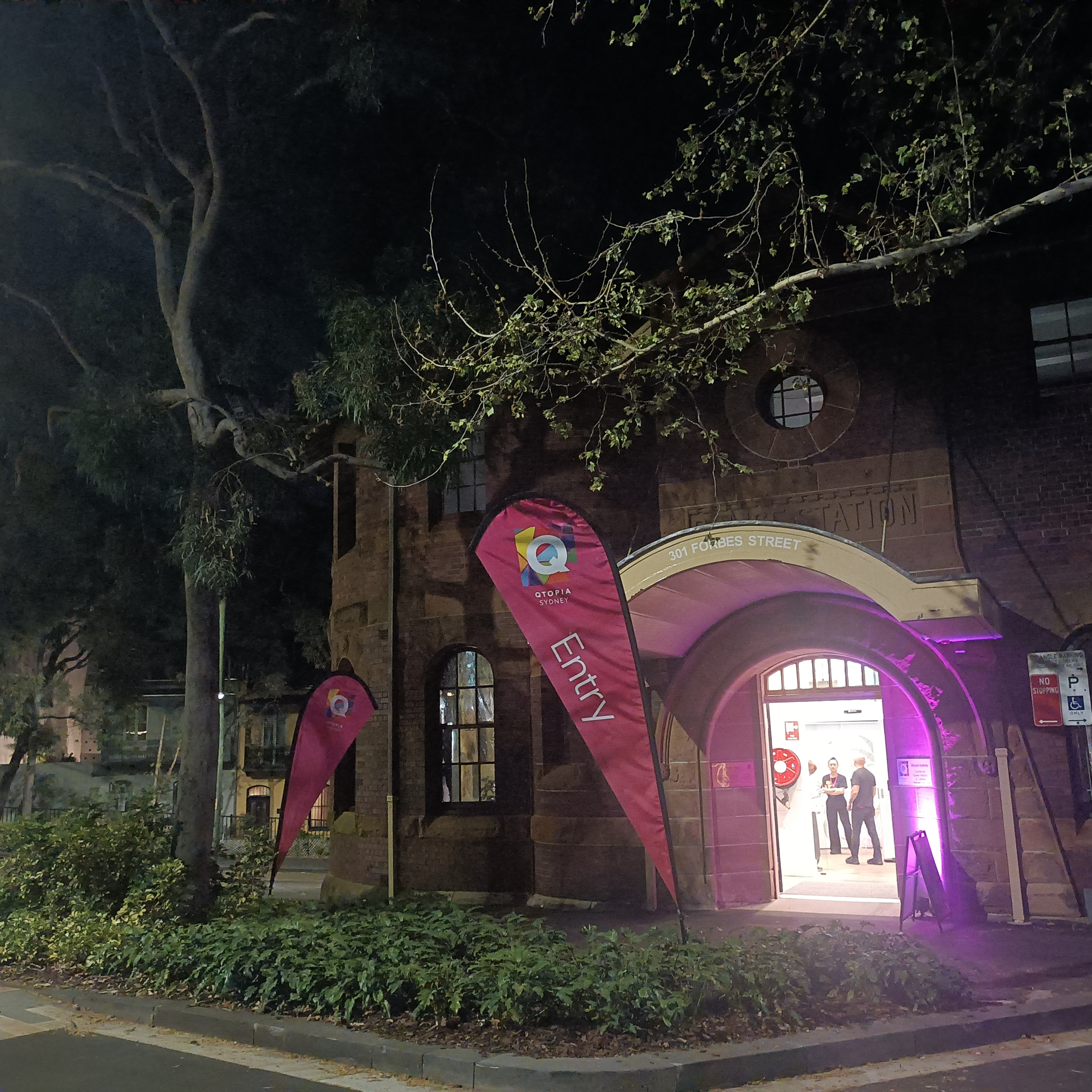
Main entrance to Qtopia in Darlinghurst, adjacent to Taylor square. Qtopia celebrates queer stories in Sydney. 2026

There is also a gallery in the National Art School that hosts exhibitions in a mid-19th century sandstone building.

The Watters Gallery in Riley Street was a longstanding institution run by Frank Watters and his associates Geoffrey and Alex Legge, finally closing its doors in November 2018.

The Eternity Playhouse in Burton Street Darlinghurst opened in 2013, following the renovation of the former Burton Street Tabernacle, which was founded in 1887. Following its purchase by the City of Sydney in 2004, plans were gradually developed to renovate the building as a theatre. The 200-seat theatre is the home of the Darlinghurst Theatre Company, and the renovation was designed by architecture firm Tonkin Zulaikha Greer.

In February 2024, a new museum, titled Qtopia, opened in Darlinghurst, celebrating queer stories with an extensive collection of objects related to queer culture in Sydney. It sits across three main sites which include the main building at 301 Forbes St., Darlinghurst, the substation and the underground toilet block, both of which are located at the northern end of Taylor Square.

It initially began as a temporary exhibition held during Sydney World Pride in 2023 and was located in the bandstand pavilion in Green Park, Darlinghurst, as well as at the National Art School that sits adjacent to Green Park in Darlinghurst. The underground toilet block was opened to the public in 1907 and then closed in 1998 and it now hosts "exhibitions exploring Sydney's gay beat, sauna and cruising culture of the 1980s and 90s." and it was itself the location of a popular beat in Sydney for decades until its closure. The substations 40-seat theatre hosts performances including music, drag, comedy, cabaret and poetry all year round with numerous performances being held in conjunction with the Sydney Gay and Lesbian Mardi Gras in February and March each year as well as during Pride month in June of each year.

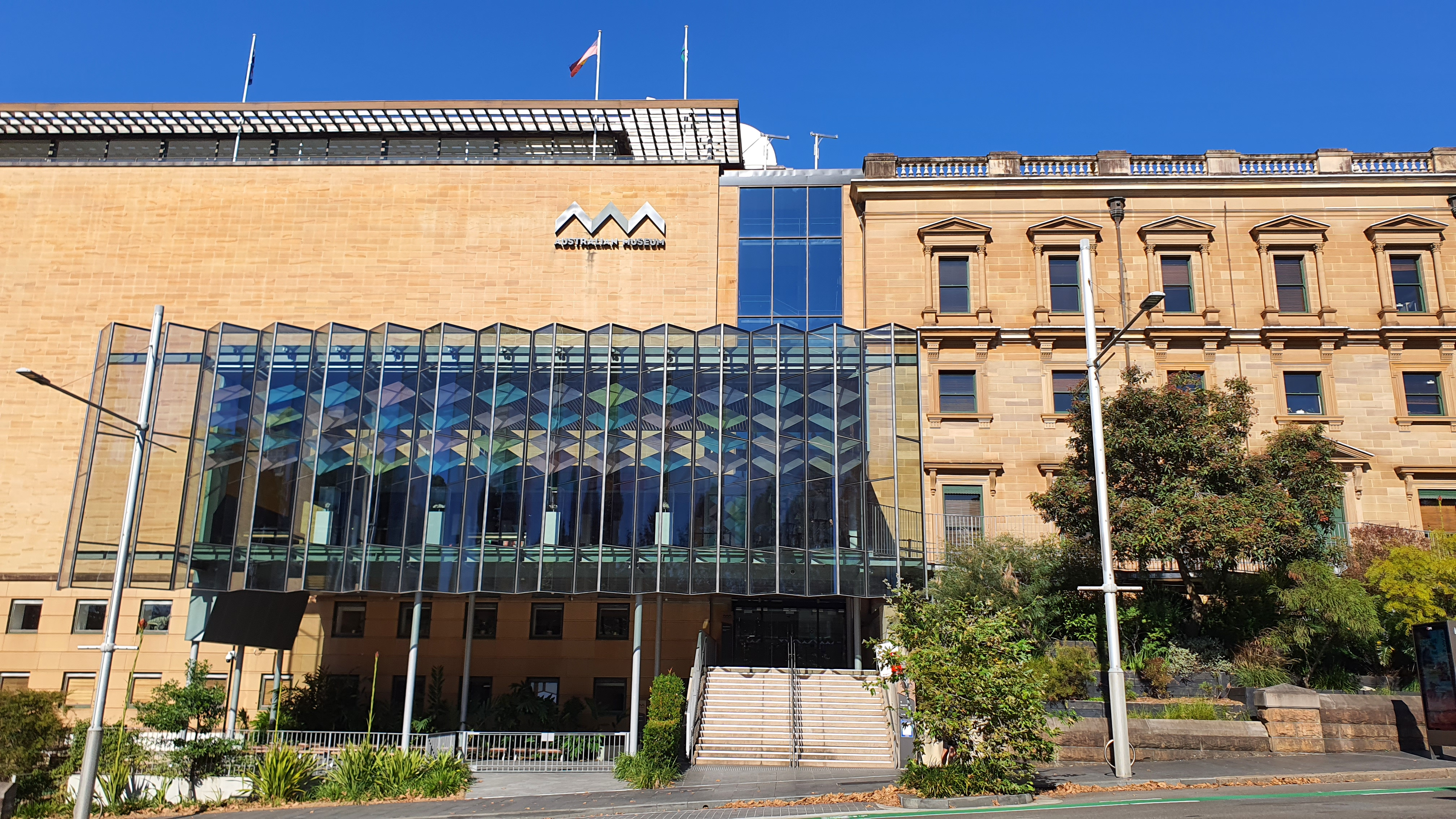
The Australian Museum at 1 William street, Darlinghurst. 2023

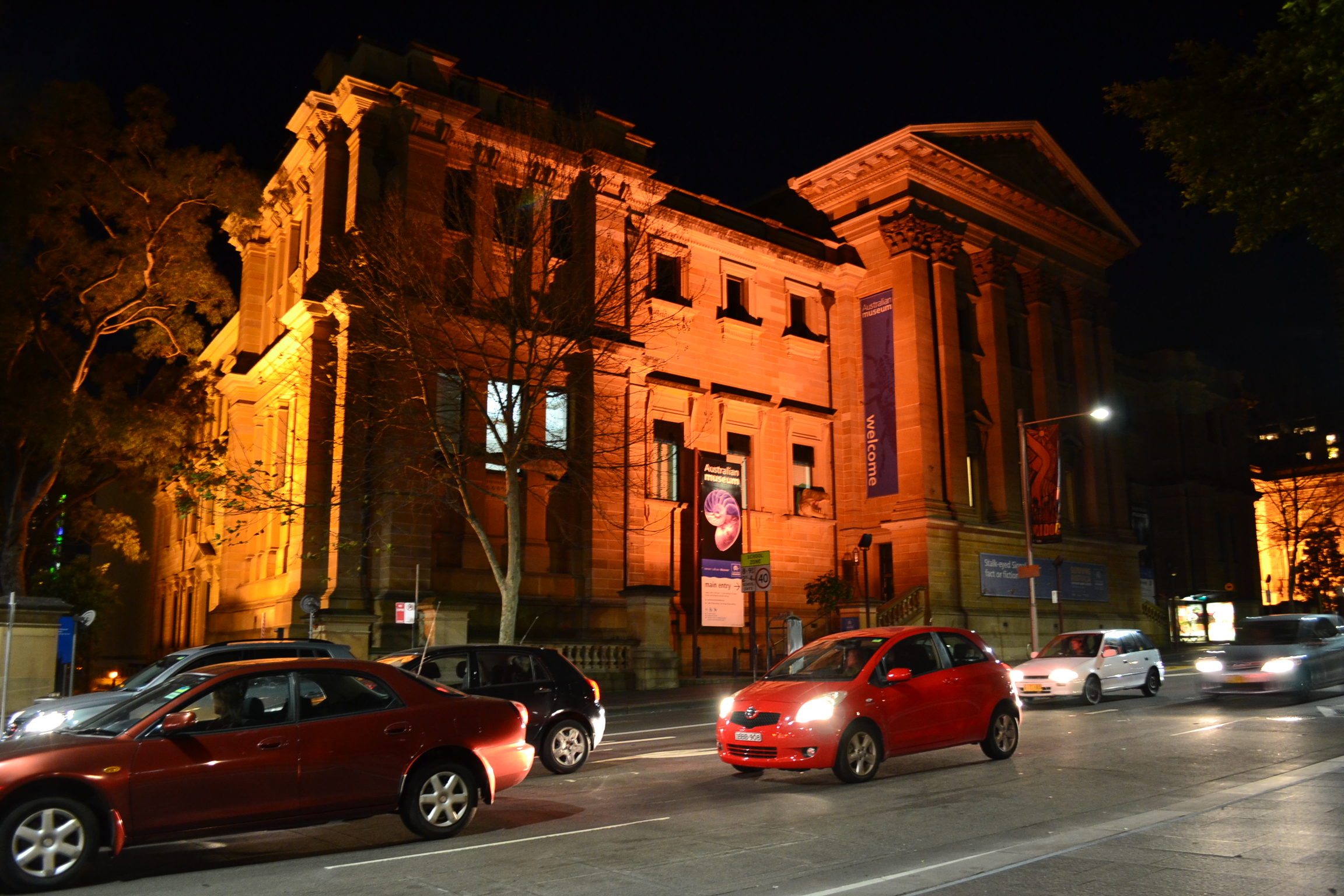
Australian Museum at night. 2011

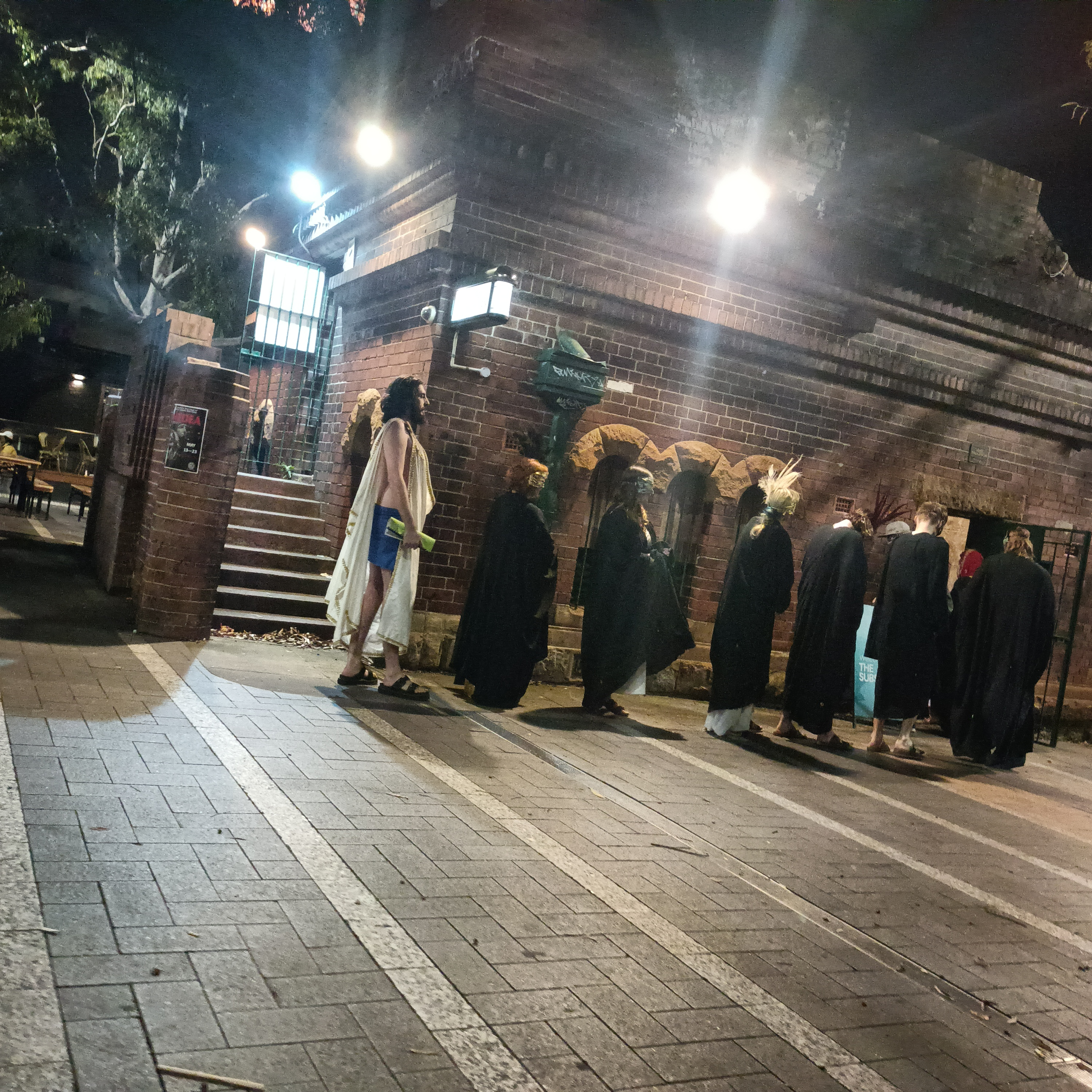
Performers in costumes entering the substation. 2026

== Notable residents ==
- Phillip Adams (1939–), AO, FAHA, FRSA, Australian humanist social commentator, broadcaster, public intellectual and farmer, lived at Stoneleigh in the mid to late 1980s
- George Edward Ardill (1889–1964), evangelist and social worker
- Flora Sydney Eldershaw (1897–1956), author and critic
- Cecil Patrick Healy (1881–1918), swimmer and commercial traveller
- Michael Hutchence (1960–1997), INXS singer lived in Darlinghurst in the 1980s
- Baz Luhrmann (1962–) and Catherine Martin (1965–), lived in Iona (1880) from 1997 to 2016
- Damian Moss (1976–), born in Darlinghurst, former pitcher for the Atlanta Braves and the San Francisco Giants
- Mark Nielsen (1968–), businessman
- Vera Purdy (1909–1940), prostitute and underworld figure
- Karl Stefanovic (1974–), host of Nine Network's Today Show

== See also ==
- LGBTQ culture in Sydney
- Taylor Square
- Surry Hills
