= Rene Gonzalez =

Rene Gonzalez may refer to:

- Rene Gonzales (born 1960), American former professional baseball infielder
- René González (baseball) (1918–1982), Cuban baseball player
- Rene Gonzalez (politician), American politician based in Portland, Oregon
- Rene Gonzalez Architects, an architecture firm
- René González (singer) (born 1964), Puerto Rican christian music singer.
- René González, Cuban intelligence officer, one of the Cuban Five
