= Pulse Memorial and Museum =

Museum under construction

National Pulse Memorial and Museum
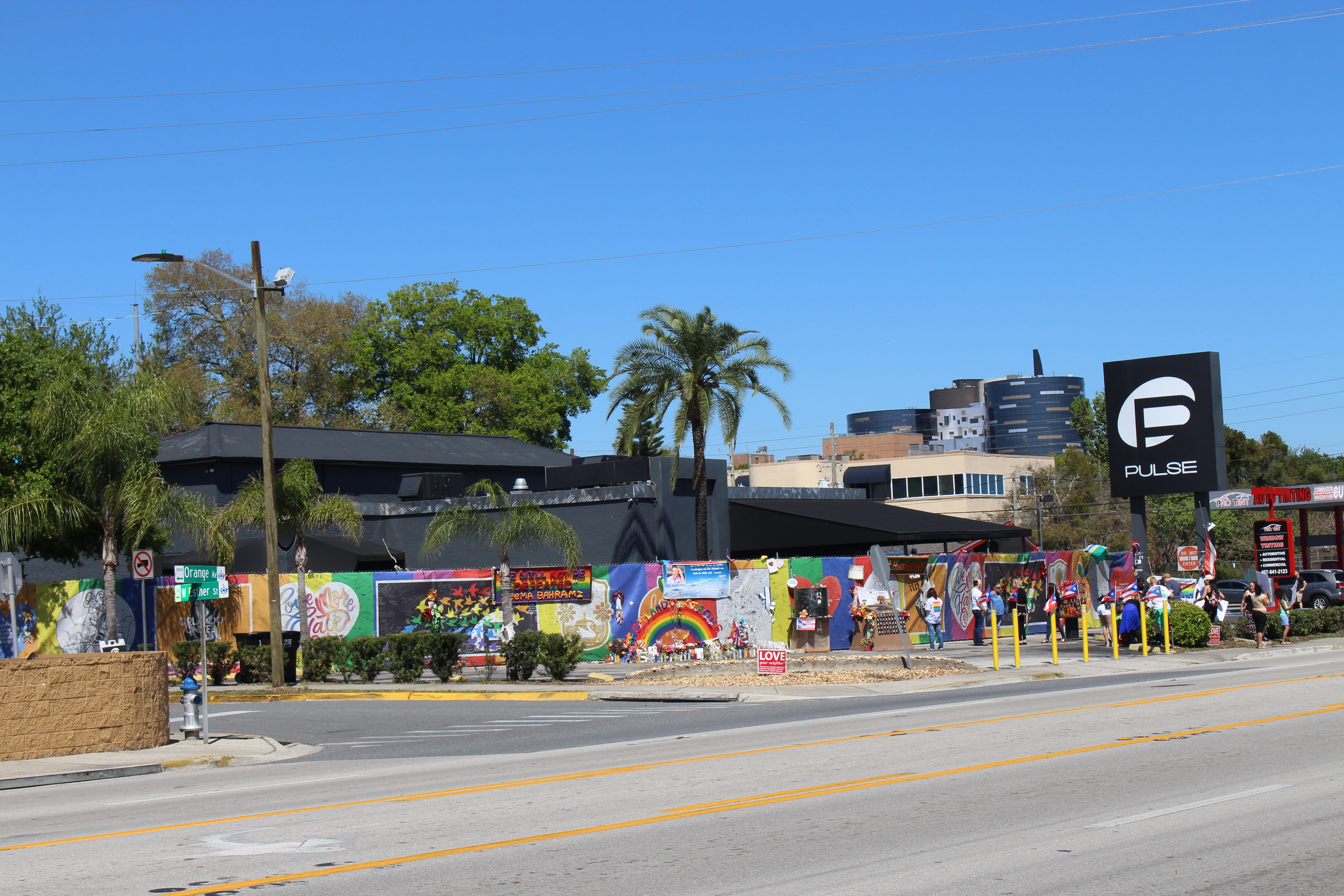
- National Pulse Memorial Wall
- Location: Orlando, Florida
- Type: Memorial and museum
- Dedicated to: Victims of the Orlando nightclub shooting at Pulse in 2016

The National Pulse Memorial and Museum was a planned memorial and museum commemorating victims of the Orlando nightclub shooting at Pulse in 2016, originally slated to open in 2022. In 2021, the site was designated by Congress as a national memorial.

== Temporary memorial efforts ==
In an effort to honor the 49 victims and to memorialize the location surrounding the Pulse Nightclub building, the City of Orlando dedicated $4,518 to erect a barrier fence to fulfill this purpose. Following this, the City discussed purchasing the Nightclub for $2.25 million, but the vote was postponed.

In the end, Pulse Nightclub owner, Barbara Poma, cited personal and emotional connection to the site as the main reasons as to why she chose not to sell the property. Since this time, Poma and others have been raising funds for a memorial, museum, and scholarships through her nonprofit, the onePULSE Foundation.

== Design ==
The onePULSE Foundation released a request for proposals in March 2019, with proposals being due by January 31, 2020. Six finalists were selected from the total 68 submissions received, with the final design being chosen from Coldefy & Associes with RDAI. The selection process was completed by a blue-ribbon jury made up of representatives from onePulse, the Orlando community, architect professionals, and others. The decision was made as a collective group, with consideration in mind to the over 2,300 comments that were submitted from the victims' families, survivors, and the community with recommendations for memorial concepts.

Design Team	Result	Ref.
Coldefy & Associés with RDAI, HHCP Architects, Xavier Veilhan, dUCKS scéno, Agence TER, and Prof. Laila Farah	Winner	
Diller Scofidio + Renfro and Rene Gonzalez Architects with Raymond Jungles, Teresita Fernández, and Oliver Beer	Finalist	
heneghan peng architects, Wannemacher Jensen Architects, Gustafson Porter + Bowman, Sven Anderson, Pentagram, and Bartenbach LichtLabor	Finalist	
MASS Design Group, Little Diversified Architectural Consulting, Ralph Applebaum Associates, Sasaki, Sanford Biggers, Richard Blanco, and Porsha Olayiwola	Finalist	
MVRDV, McKenzie Architects, Grant Associates, GSM Project, and Studio Drift	Finalist	
Studio Libeskind with Baker Barrios Architects, Claude Cormier + Associés, Thinc, and Jenny Holzer	Finalist	

The latest design included several pieces that come together to form a community presence and dedicated reflective, interactive, and connective spaces. The National Pulse Memorial would have the focus of serving as a quiet and peaceful garden setting, and was set to include different symbolic features such as 49 trees, 49 color lines, and a reflecting pool surrounding the Pulse building, to honor the 49 victims lost in the events of the Pulse shooting. A separate museum would be located at 438 West Kaley Street, Orlando, FL 32806, and would be erected in a shape representing a growing flower. The museum would serve as an interactive center to learn, gather, and host community programming. The project was set to cost $45 million to complete. Entrance to the memorial would be free year-round, but the museum would have an admission charge. Architectural renderings and videos have been made available to the public to view and comment on the onePULSE foundation's website.

The plans have received some criticism from survivors and families of victims for being too large and expensive, as well as due to unpermitted renovations and code violations documented at the nightclub at the time of the shooting. In late October 2023, onePULSE's plans for the Memorial and Museum were permanently suspended. The City of Orlando approved a purchase of the site to convert the temporary memorial into a permanent one. In December 2023, Mayor Buddy Dyer announced an approach in which the city will utilize the existing 501c3 and establish the Orlando United Pulse Memorial Fund, in an effort to raise funds for the permanent memorial. The fund will hope to raise from community donations, such as from local businesses, community organizations, and individuals.

== Street art memorial ==
A rainbow crossing, sometimes called the Pulse Memorial rainbow crosswalk, was painted near the memorial in 2017 and painted over in 2025. Soon afterwards, people colored the sidewalk with chalk in opposition to the painting over as law enforcement watched and warned them to stay out of the street.

== See also ==
- List of LGBTQ monuments and memorials
- List of museums in Florida
- List of national memorials of the United States
- Rainbow crossings in Florida
