= Pulse (nightclub) =

Gay bar in Orlando, Florida

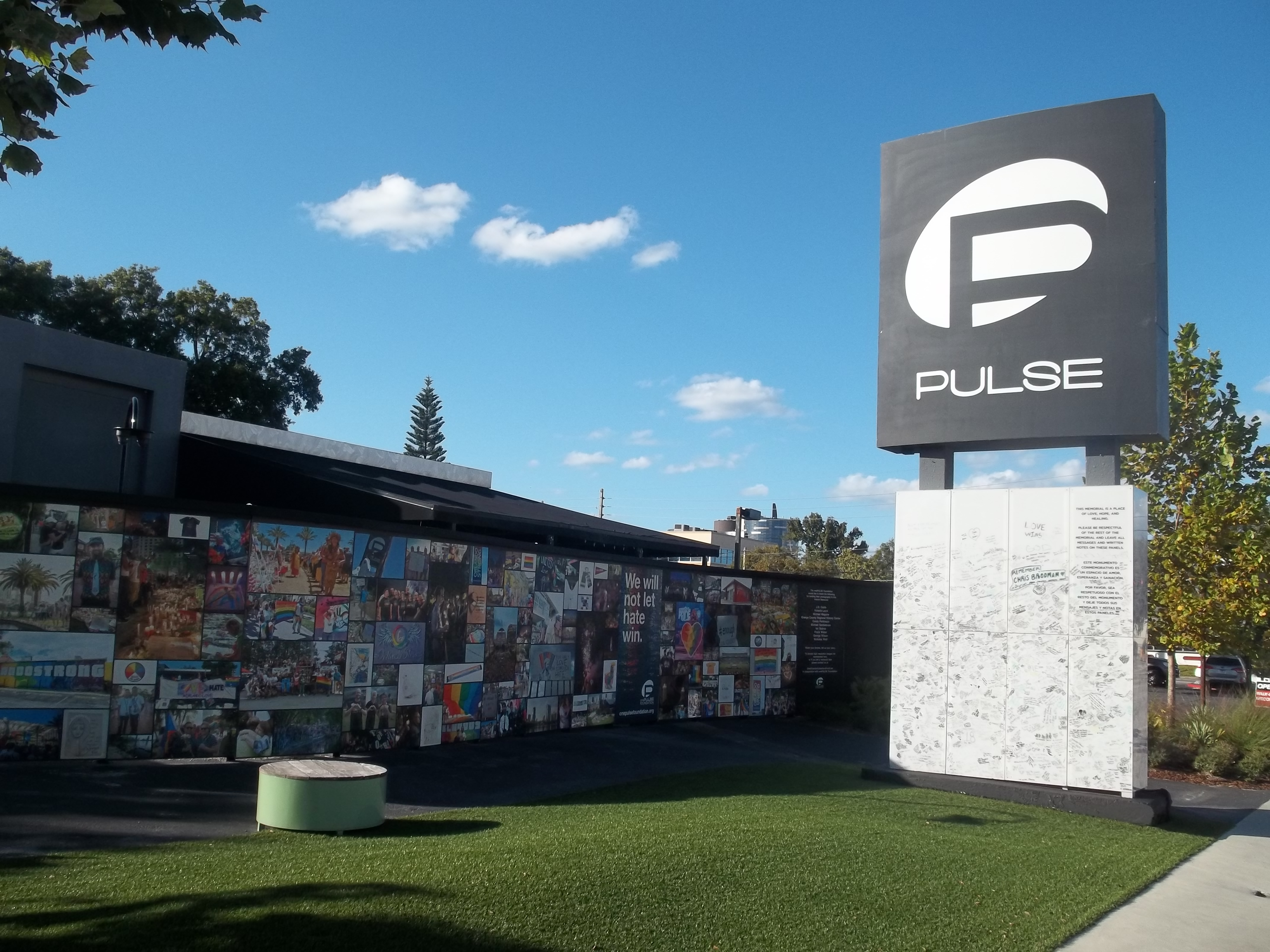
- Exterior in 2019
- Interactive map of Pulse
- Full name: Pulse Orlando
- Address: 1912 South Orange Avenue
- Location: Orlando, Florida, U.S.
- Coordinates: 28°31′10″N 81°22′37″W
- Owner: Barbara Poma; Ron Legler

Construction
- Opened: July 2, 2004; 22 years ago
- Closed: June 12, 2016

Website
- Pulse Orlando Website memorial at the Wayback Machine (archived January 9, 2024)

Pulse was a gay bar, dance club, and nightclub in Orlando, Florida, founded in 2004 by Barbara Poma and Ron Legler. On June 12, 2016, the club was the scene of the second-deadliest mass shooting by a single gunman in U.S. history, and the second-deadliest terrorist attack on U.S. soil since the September 11 attacks. 49 people were killed and 58 other people were injured.

== Description ==
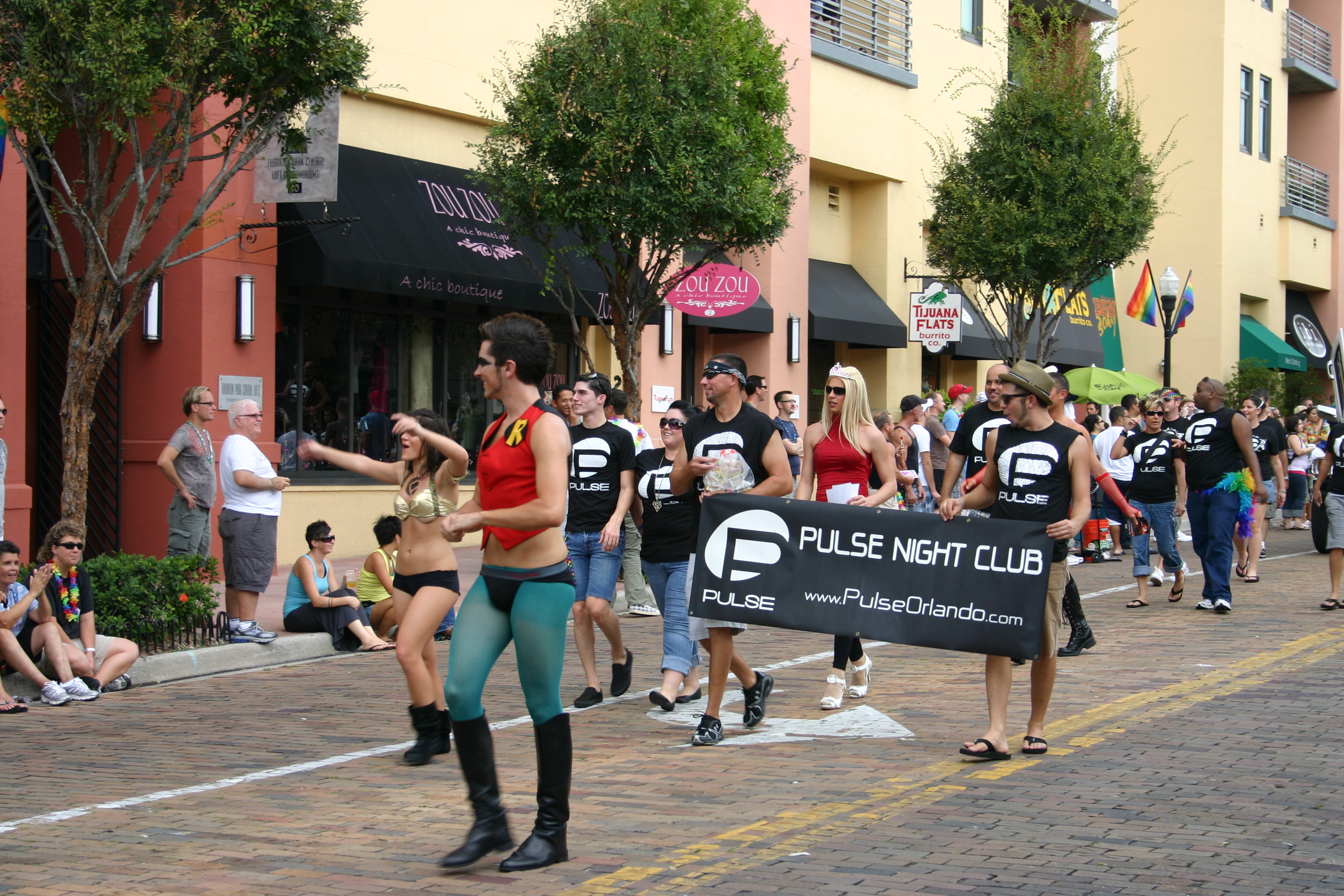
Pulse representation at Come Out with Pride, 2009

Pulse hosted themed performances each night and had a monthly program featuring educational events geared towards the LGBTQ community. According to Orlando Weekly, Pulse featured "three glitzy, throbbing rooms of club boys, twinks and twinks at heart. Every night has something different in store, but Pulse is known to have some pretty impressive drag shows, and the bar's dancers are usually gorgeous." Because of the three areas, Lonely Planet Discover Florida deemed it "three nightclubs," while their Florida volume focused on it being "ultramodern."

Top 10 Orlando called it a "firm favorite for the Orlando gay crowd," The Rough Guide to Florida deemed it "justifiably popular," citing its "great lighting and sound plus cabaret performers, drag acts, and erotic dancers." Pulse was the only gay club mentioned in The Rough Guide to the USA for Orlando. According to listings, the entire premises, including the washrooms, were accessible. Using "periodic consumer surveys," Zagat rated Pulse 25/30 for atmosphere, 25/30 decor, and 22/30 service.

== History ==
Then-President Barack Obama stating Pulse was a refuge for LGBTQ people

In 1985—prior to Pulse's founding—the property located at 1912 South Orange Avenue was home to a pizza restaurant named Lorenzo's. By 1999, it was called Dante's, a bar with live music. Dante's closed in January 2003.

Founded by Barbara Poma and Ron Legler, Pulse opened on July 2, 2004. Poma's brother, John, died in 1991 from AIDS, and the club is "named for John's pulse to live on," according to a marketing staff member in February 2016. The venue had a focus on local talent. Poma ensured that her brother's memory was prominent on the website, and that the facility was more than "just another gay club." Legler, who was president of the Florida Theatrical Association when Pulse was founded, also founded two nightclubs in Lake Eola Park in 2010, before moving to Baltimore in 2014. The Washington Post described the club's first 12 years as "a community hub for HIV prevention, breast-cancer awareness and immigrant rights," and reported it had partnered with educational and advocacy groups such as Come Out with Pride, Equality Florida, and the Zebra Coalition.

=== June 2016 massacre ===
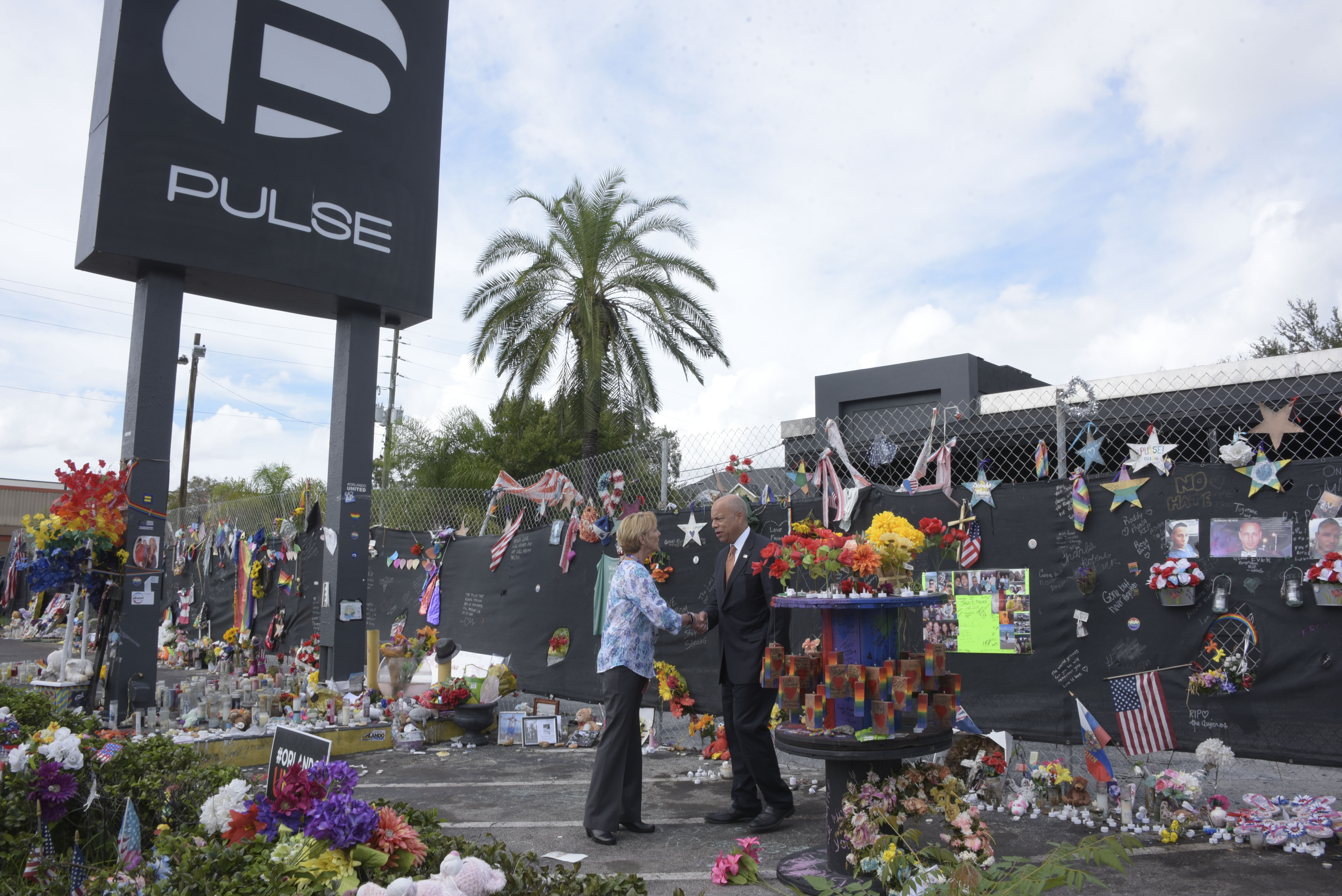
Secretary of Homeland Security Jeh Johnson visits Pulse and the makeshift memorial outside of it on the three-month anniversary of the shooting

On June 12, 2016, Omar Mateen, a 29-year-old Islamic extremist, killed 49 people and wounded 58 others in a mass shooting. Mateen affirmed he was acting on behalf of the terrorist group IS, and swore allegiance to the group's leader, Abu Bakr al-Baghdadi. On the day of the shooting, IS had also released a statement via Amaq News Agency, taking responsibility for the attack. The attack was the deadliest single gunman mass shooting in United States history until the 2017 Las Vegas shooting, the deadliest incident of violence against LGBTQ people in U.S. history, surpassing the UpStairs Lounge arson attack of 1973, and the deadliest terrorist attack on U.S. soil since the September 11 attacks of 2001.

In November 2016, the city of Orlando agreed to buy the nightclub for $2.25 million. Mayor Buddy Dyer expressed plans to convert the nightclub into a memorial to honor the memory of the victims. Barbara Poma, the owner, refused to sell the nightclub to the city in December 2016. Instead she announced in May 2017 the creation of the onePULSE Foundation to independently fund a Pulse Memorial and Museum planned to open in 2022.

On October 19, 2023, the city of Orlando announced they had purchased the Pulse nightclub and would demolish the existing structure and build a permanent memorial on the former site. Demolition of the nightclub began on March 18, 2026.

== See also ==
- List of LGBTQ bars
- List of terrorist incidents in 2016
- Our Happy Hours
- Rainbow crossings in Florida
