= Rainbow crossings in Taipei =

LGBTQ symbols in Taiwan

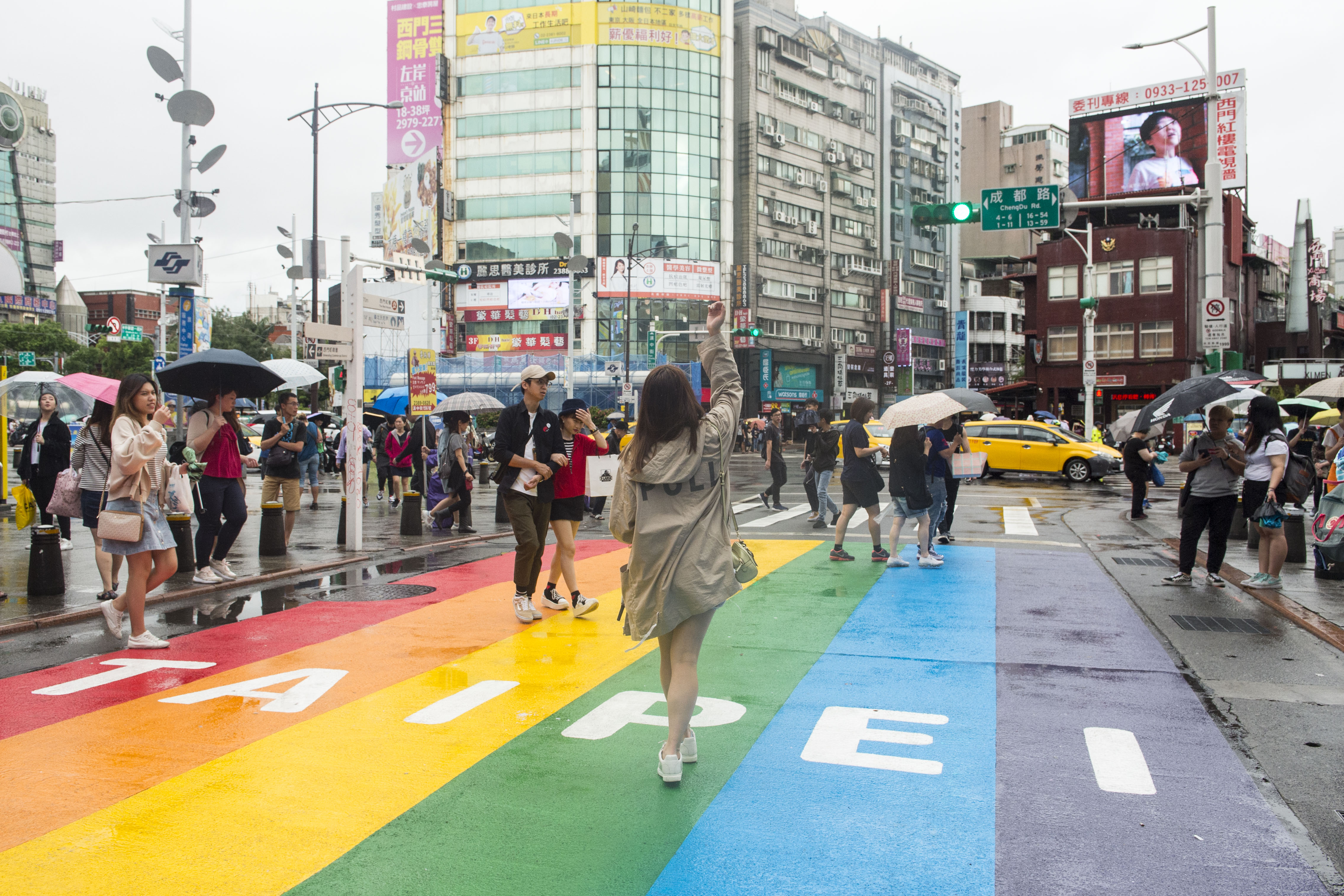
The rainbow crossing known as Rainbow Six in Ximending in 2019

There are two rainbow crossings in Taipei, Taiwan. The first, called Rainbow Six, was installed in Ximending, Wanhua District, in September 2019. A second, called Rainbow Starting Line, was installed outside Taipei City Hall in the Xinyi District in September 2020.

== Rainbow Six, Wanhua District ==
The first rainbow crossing, known as Rainbow Six (6號彩虹), is painted outside Exit 6 of the Ximen metro station in Ximending, Wanhua District. It was painted in September 2019, following the legalization of same-sex marriage in Taiwan in May. In addition to being a symbol for LGBTQ people, Rainbow Six "symbolizes Taipei's support for the LGBT+ community and gender equality, and ... has become one of Taipei's most seen Instagram check-ins".

The art installation was cleaned by workers hired by Yo Wash in 2022. In 2023, the popular landmark was featured in the 30th TravelTour Expo, which hosted Filipino tourists in Taiwan, as well as the Taiwan Pavilion at the Travel Madness Expo.

== Rainbow Starting Line, Xinyi District ==
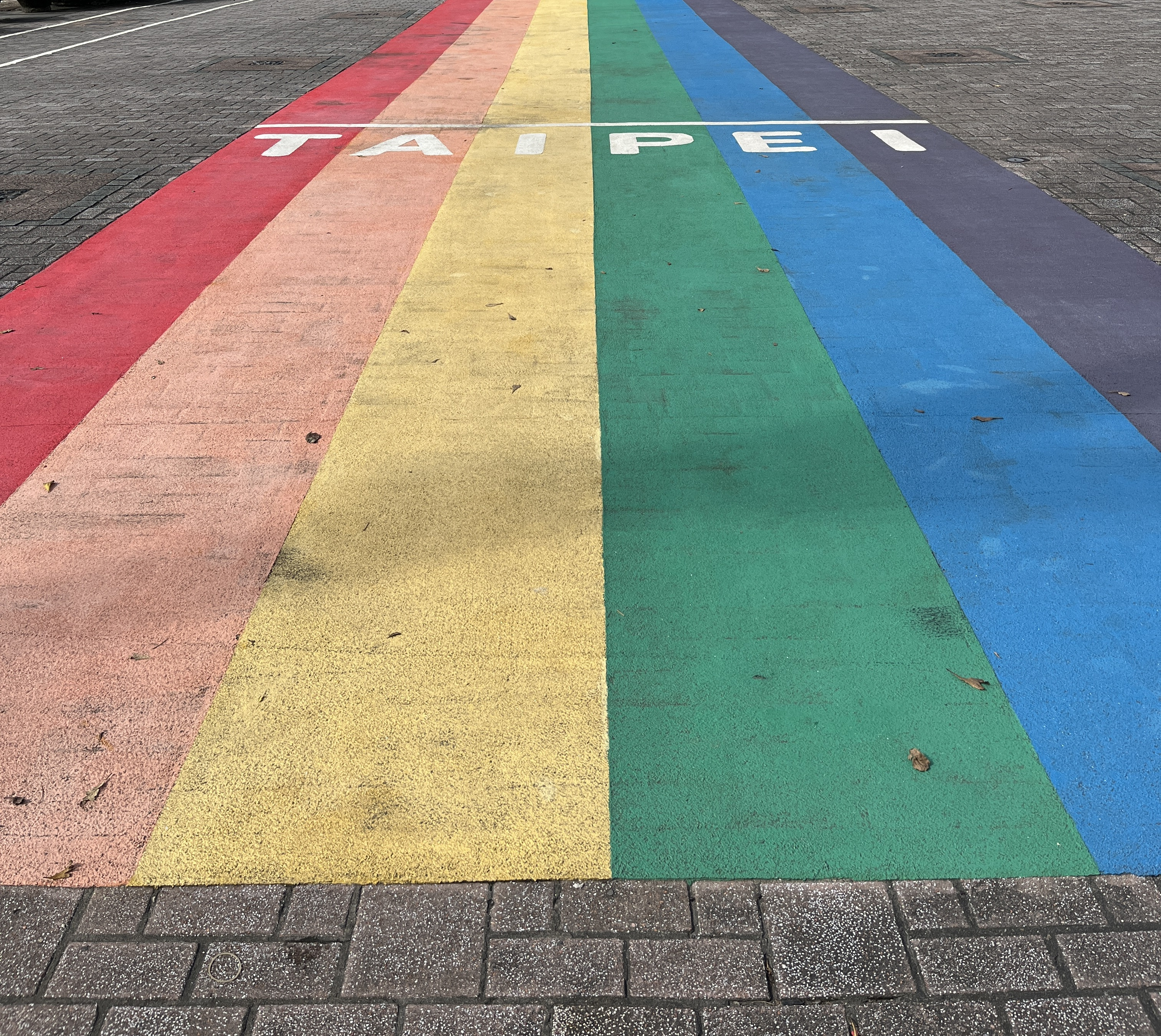
Rainbow Starting Line in 2024

A second rainbow crossing, known as Rainbow Starting Line, was installed outside Taipei City Hall in the Xinyi Planning District in September 2020, in conjunction with Pride Month and leading up to the city's annual pride parade. The landmark is part of a series of activities promoting LGBTQ tourism within Taipei by the Department of Information and Tourism; other initiatives have included the LGBTQ mascot Jiben Rencyuan, the Rainbow Bus Tour, and an illumination show at City Hall.

According to Taipei Travel, "the rainbow landscape stretches towards the City Council from the City Government, resembling a line aptly drawn in the form of a runway, stretching to the starting point of happiness. It not only conveys the true original spirit of gender equality advocated by Taipei City, but further echoes the Taiwan Pride Parade launched from the City Government every year." They also said, "The rainbow landscape combines expectations and everyone's enthusiasm, encouraging us to take firm steps and steadily make headway along the road of happiness."

In 2024, the crossing was a starting point for the city's Rainbow Sightseeing Bus Tour as part of the Color Taipei event.

== See also ==
- LGBTQ history in Taiwan
- List of LGBTQ monuments and memorials
- List of tourist attractions in Taipei
- Taiwan Pride
