= Come Out with Pride =

US nonprofit organization

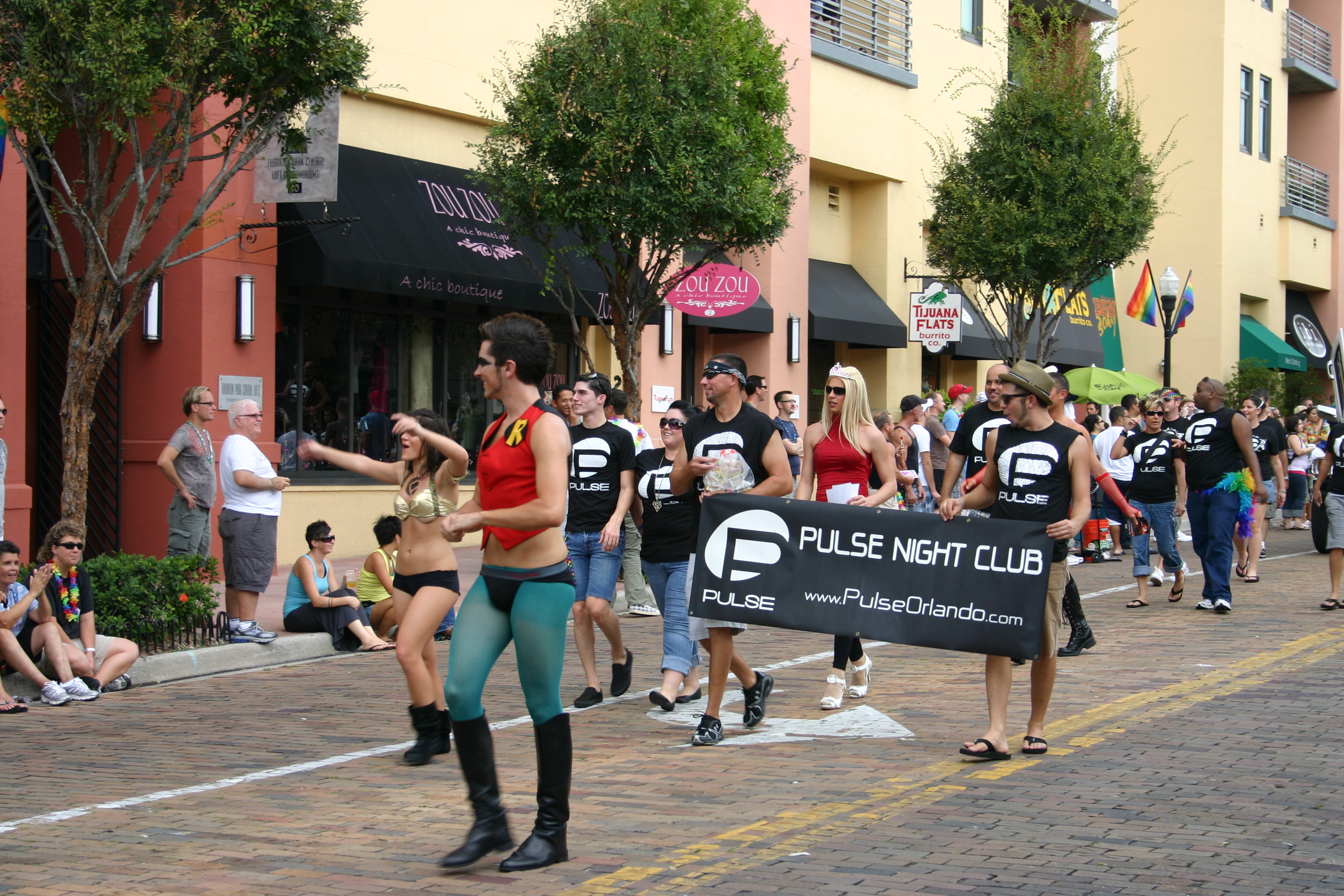
- Procession of Pulse nightclub at Come Out With Pride Parade, 2009
- Abbreviation: COWP
- Type: 501(c)(3) nonprofit
- Purpose: Organizes an annual pride event
- Headquarters: Orlando, Florida
- Website: Official website

Come Out with Pride (COWP) is a 501(c)(3) nonprofit organization based in Orlando, Florida, that has organized an annual pride event of the same name since 2005. The group was cited as an example of the community activities centered at the Pulse nightclub following a terrorist attack on that location.

== History ==
The Metropolitan Business Association or Central Florida LGBT Chamber of Commerce sponsored the first pride parade in Orlando in 2005. In 2018, 175,000 people attended the parade, making it one of the largest pride events in Florida.

The Come Out with Pride schedule spans a week of varied activities for attendees. The parade takes place in Lake Eola Park, located in Downtown Orlando.

Recently, Come Out With Pride raised money via an online show. Come Out with Pride's Jeff Prystajko, who organized the fundraiser, says half of the money will go toward LGBTQ charities. The other half will go to LGBTQ people in Central Florida.

== See also ==
- Gay Days at Walt Disney World
