= Rene Gonzalez Architects =

American architectural firm

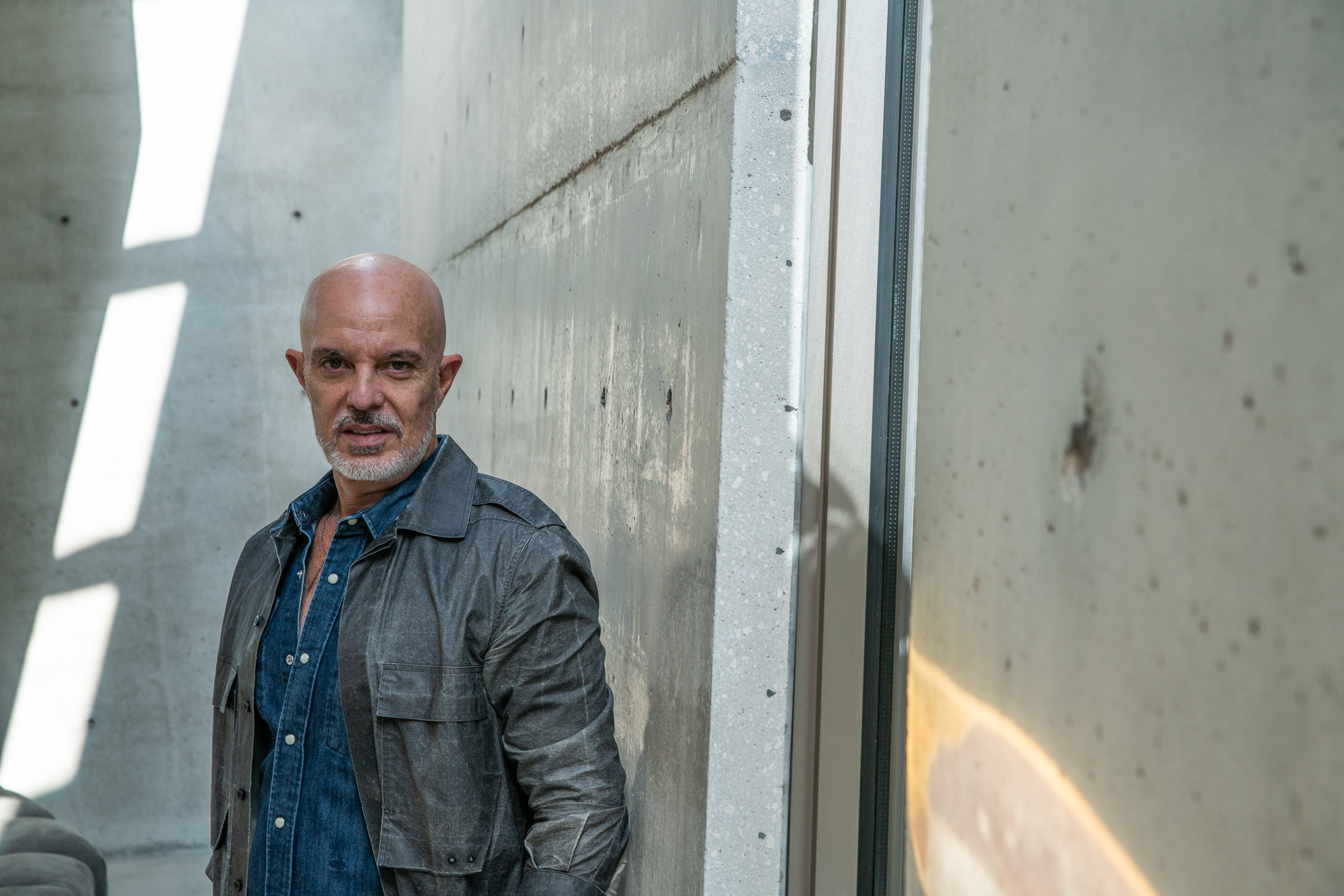
- Rene Gonzalez

Practice information
- Partners: Rene Gonzalez
- Founded: (1997)
- Location: Miami, Florida

Significant works and honors
- Projects: CasaCuba at Florida International University, Miami; Cisneros Fontanals Art Foundation (CIFO), Miami
- Awards: American Institute of Architects H. Samuel Kruse Silver Medal (2012); American Institute of Architects Firm of the Year (2011); American Institute of Architects National Award (2006, 2011)

Website
- www.renegonzalezarchitects.com

Rene Gonzalez Architects (RGA) is an American architectural firm based in Miami, Florida.

== History ==
The office was founded in 1997 by Cuban-American architect Rene Gonzalez (b. 1963). Gonzalez received a Bachelor of Design degree from the University of Florida and holds a Master of Architecture degree from UCLA.

== Work ==
RGA designed and curated the product design exhibition Design Matters at Miami’s Museum of Contemporary Art (MoCA) in 2000. The firm designed the Cisneros Fontanals Art Foundation (CIFO) for Ella Fontanals-Cisneros in 2005.

RGA designed the Berkowitz Contemporary Foundation (BCF), a non-profit foundation in Miami, to house the lighting installation Aten Reign by James Turrell, a work that debuted at the artist's retrospective at the Guggenheim Museum in 2013, and Richard Serra’s Passage of Time, an undulating 218-foot (66 m) long Cor-Ten steel sculpture, in addition to works by Larry Bell, Fred Sandback and Anish Kapoor. Other museum projects include the 2014 master plan study for the expansion of the Wolfsonian-FIU museum, a building Gonzalez renovated alongside Sarasota School of Architecture architect Mark Hampton in 1992.

Hospitality and commercial projects by the firm include a new wing for The Standard Hotel in Miami, event company KARLA, restaurant Plant, and four boutiques for boutique Alchemist, the flagship of which is located in the 1111 Lincoln Road parking garage designed by architecture firm Herzog & de Meuron.

Notable residential projects include the Indian Creek Residence, which twice broke residential sales records in Miami-Dade County, first in 2012 at $45 million and again in 2019 for $50 million. In 2017, RGA completed the Prairie Avenue Residence in Miami Beach, an elevated house designed to address the challenge of sea-level rise. The house was featured in The New York Times and in the BBC Two miniseries The World's Most Extraordinary Homes.

Key exhibition design projects have included the installation for the third (RED) Auction., which raised $10.5 million, with matching funds from the Bill & Melinda Gates Foundation, to support the fight against AIDS on December 5, 2018.

The firm has received recognition for its response to sea-level rise in South Florida.

== Awards ==
The Miami chapter of the American Institute of Architects (AIA) recognized the firm's work in 2012 with an H. Samuel Kruse Silver Medal for Design and in 2011 RGA was selected as Firm of the Year. RGA also earned two national AIA awards, one in 2006 for KARLA Conceptual Events and the other in 2011 for Alchemist.

== Notable projects ==
- CasaCuba at Florida International University
- Pulse Memorial and Museum (with Diller Scofidio + Renfro) – shortlisted for design competition (2019)

== Gallery ==
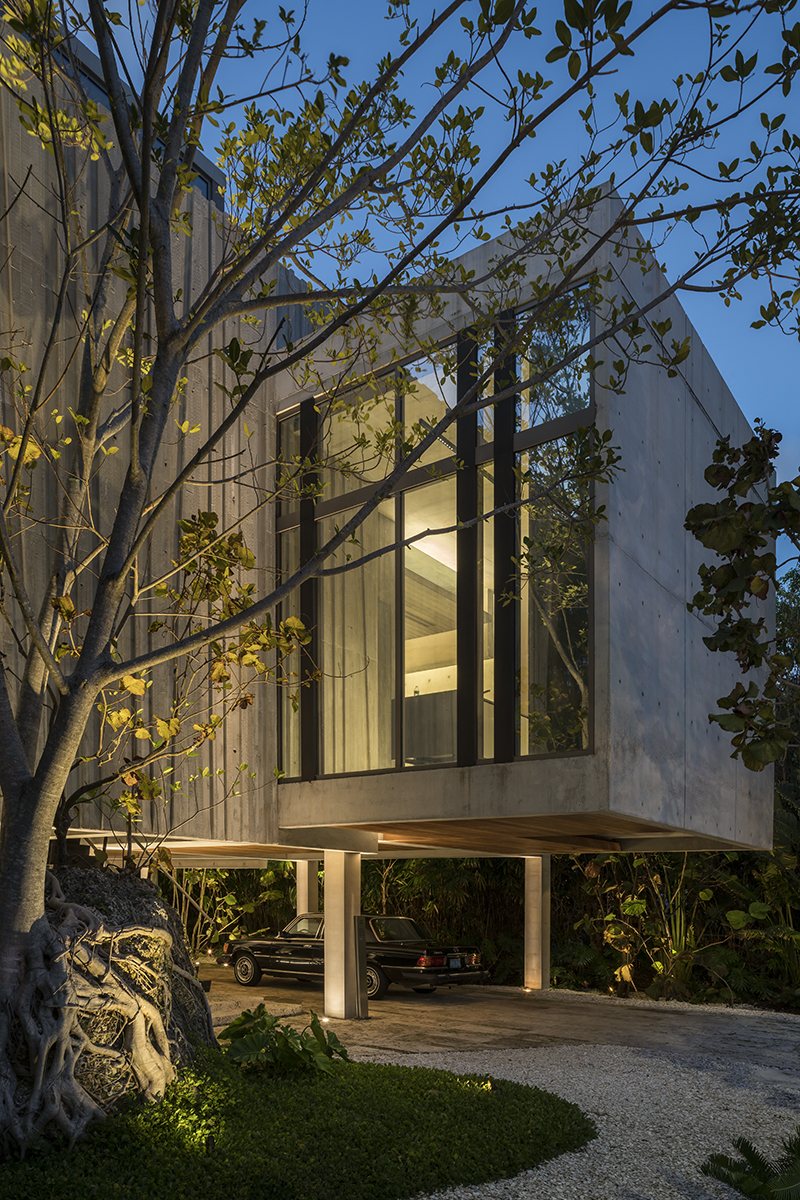
Prairie Avenue Residence, Miami (2017)

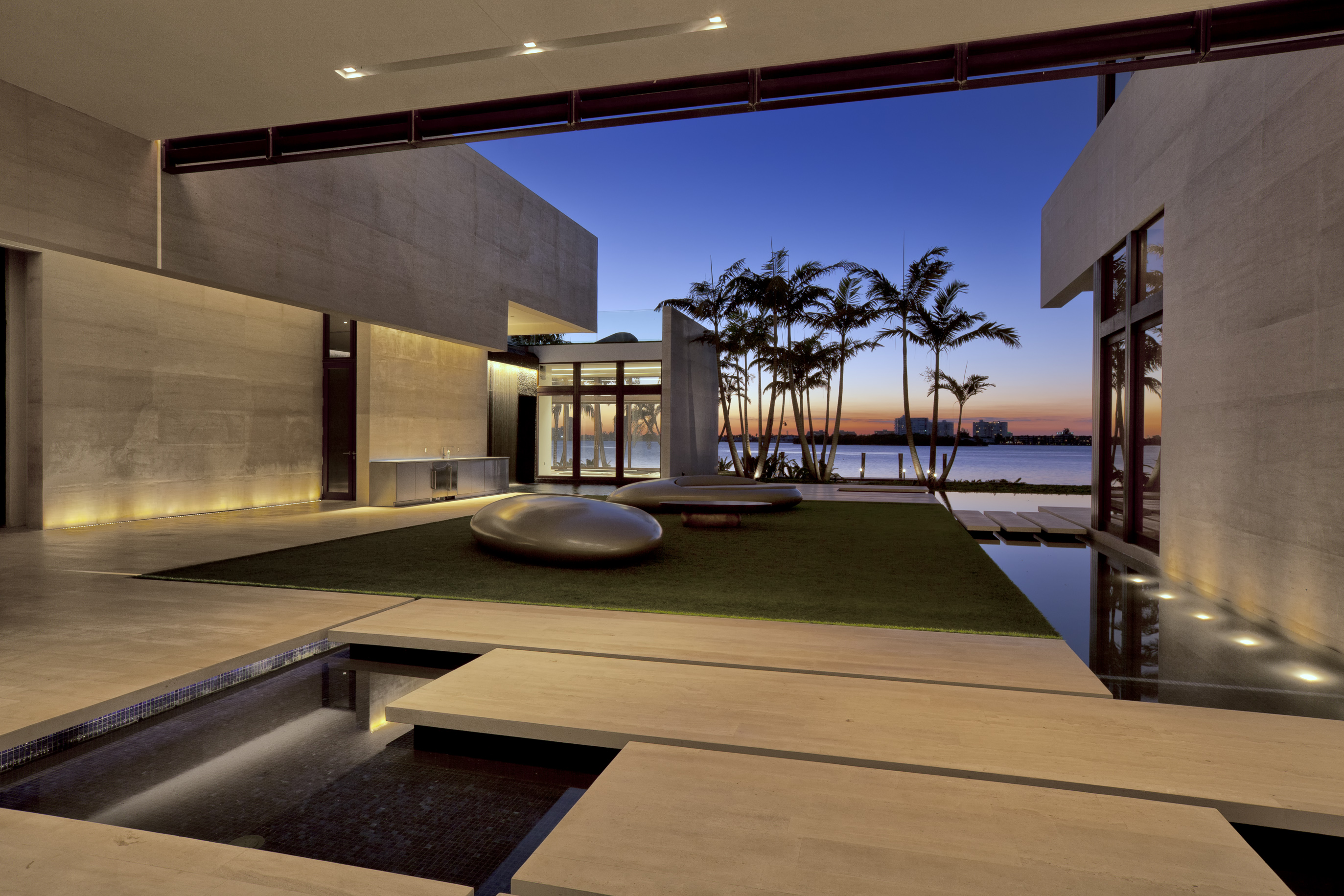
Indian Creek Residence, Miami (2010)

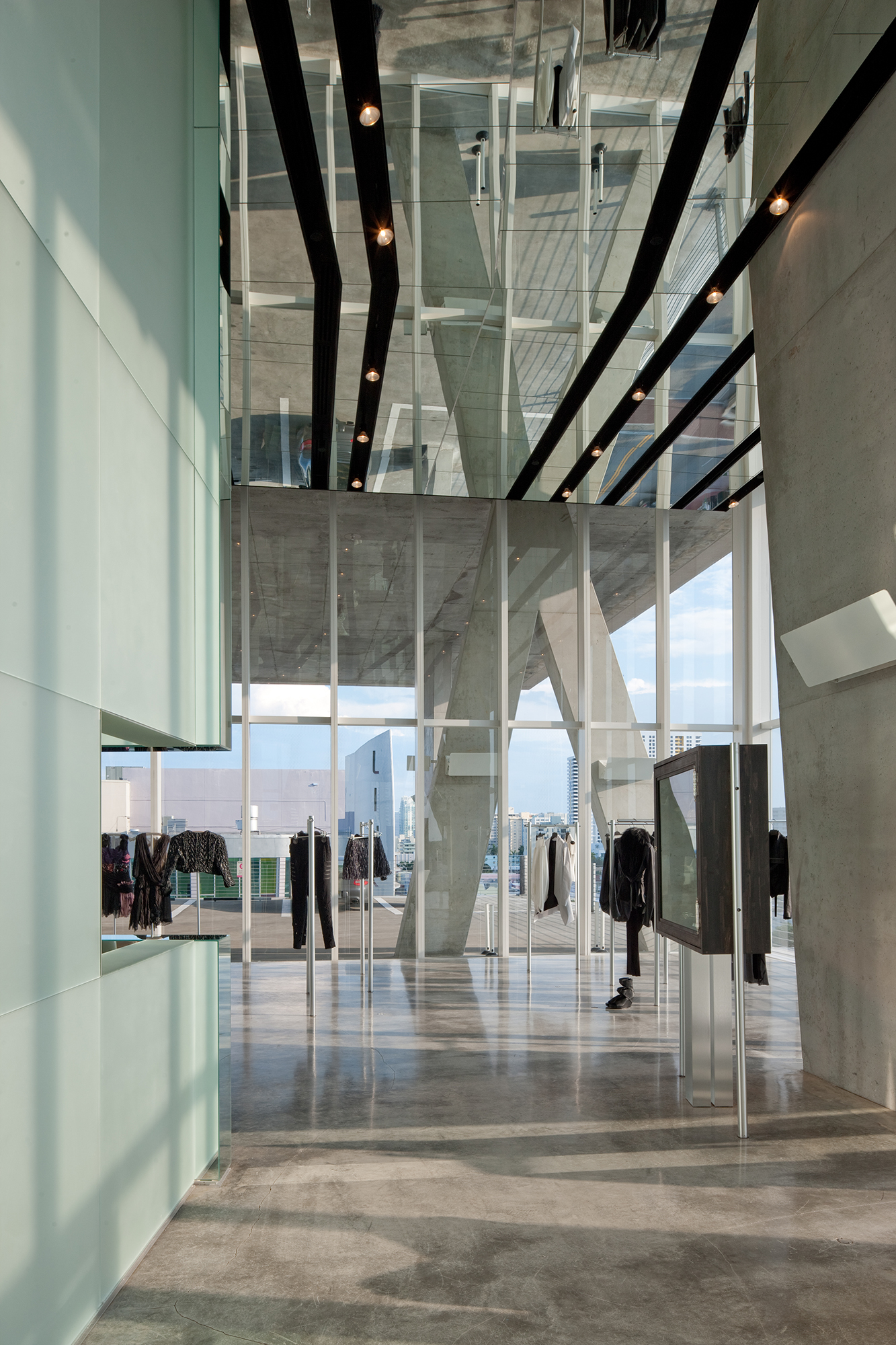
Alchemist, Miami (2010)

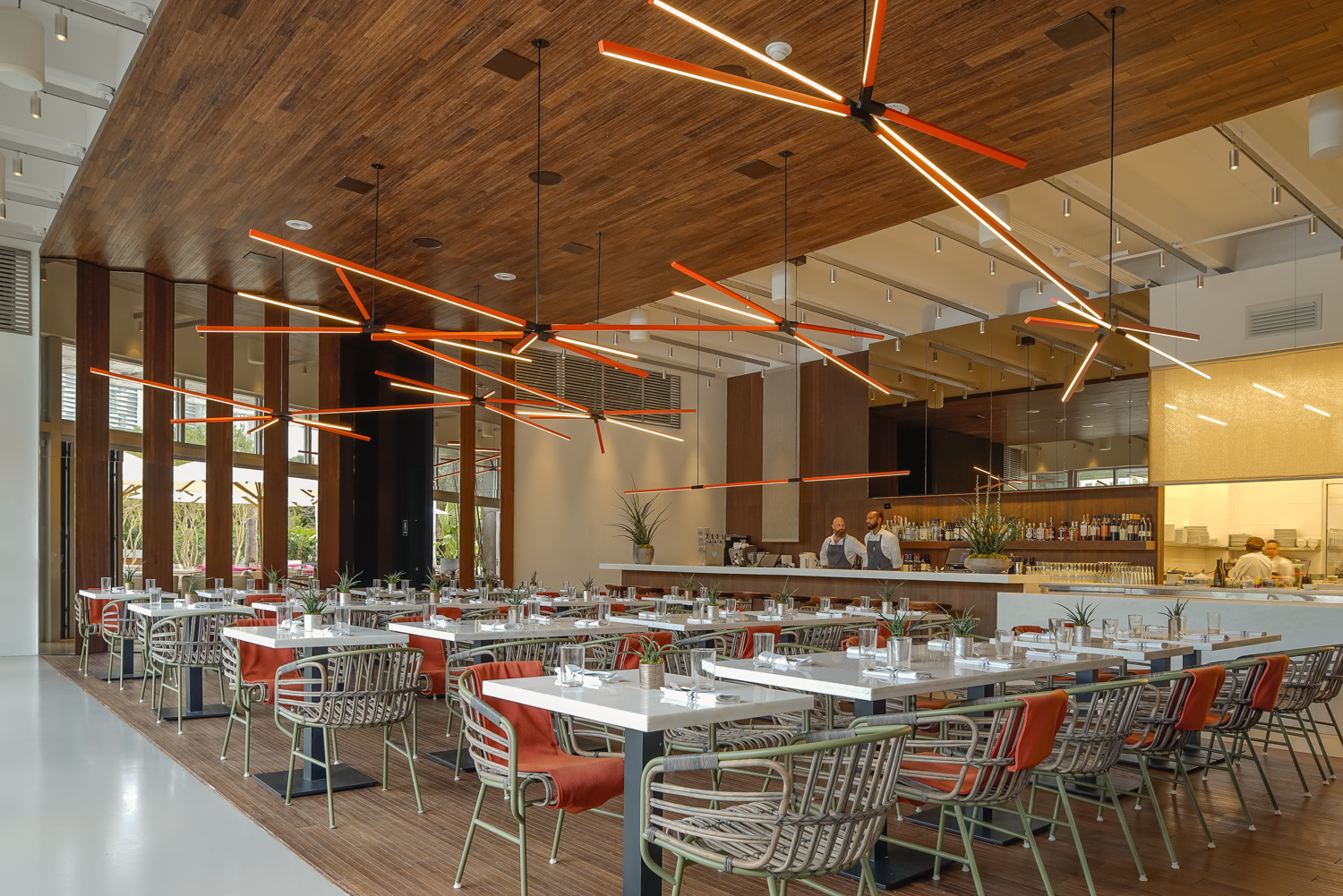
Plant, Miami (2016)
