= Rainbow crossings in Florida =

There are several rainbow crossings in Florida. In May 2025, Governor DeSantis signed Senate Bill 1662 to keep "our transportation facilities free & clear of political ideologies." The bill itself guided the Florida Department of Transportation to ensure uniformity of traffic devices. A memo from the Florida Department of Transportation released on June 30, 2025 specified that the rainbow crosswalks were to be removed on a basis of safety concerns for pedestrians and as of August 2025, they are being removed along with all non-compliant street art following orders from the Florida Department of Transportation.

== Boynton Beach ==
On June 7th, 2021, the City of Boynton Beach announced a ribbon cutting ceremony to unveil the PRIDE street mural along East Ocean Avenue. The mural painting took 4 days, from June 3rd to 7th.

On July 17th, 2025, city crew painted over the rainbow crosswalk mural in black following a memo from the Florida Department of Transportation.

== Delray Beach ==
On June 12th, 2021, the Pride Streetscape, a rainbow-painted crosswalk memorializing the victims of the Pulse nightclub shooting, was unveiling in Delray Beach. Funded by the Palm Beach County of Human Rights Council and the AIDS Healthcare Foundation, the installation took 12 days, from June 1st to the 12th.

On August 15th, FDOT issued the city of Delray Beach to remove the rainbow-painted crosswalk by Wednesday, September 3rd. The memo warned that if the city failed to do so, state crews would remove the intersection themselves and bill the city.

On September 9th, 2025, FDOT crews painted over the rainbow-painted intersection with black paint for the first time. However, rain and traffic smeared this initial layer, raising safety concerns.

On September 10th, 2025, FDOT crews painted over the intersection with black paint for the second time around midnight, before sandblasting the rainbow-painted crosswalk in the late morning.

On October 10th, 2025, at Serenity Park in Northwood Village, the first phase of a new LGBTQ Pride Monument was completed.

The rainbow crossing has been vandalized more than once. There have been calls to remove the painting.

== Key West ==
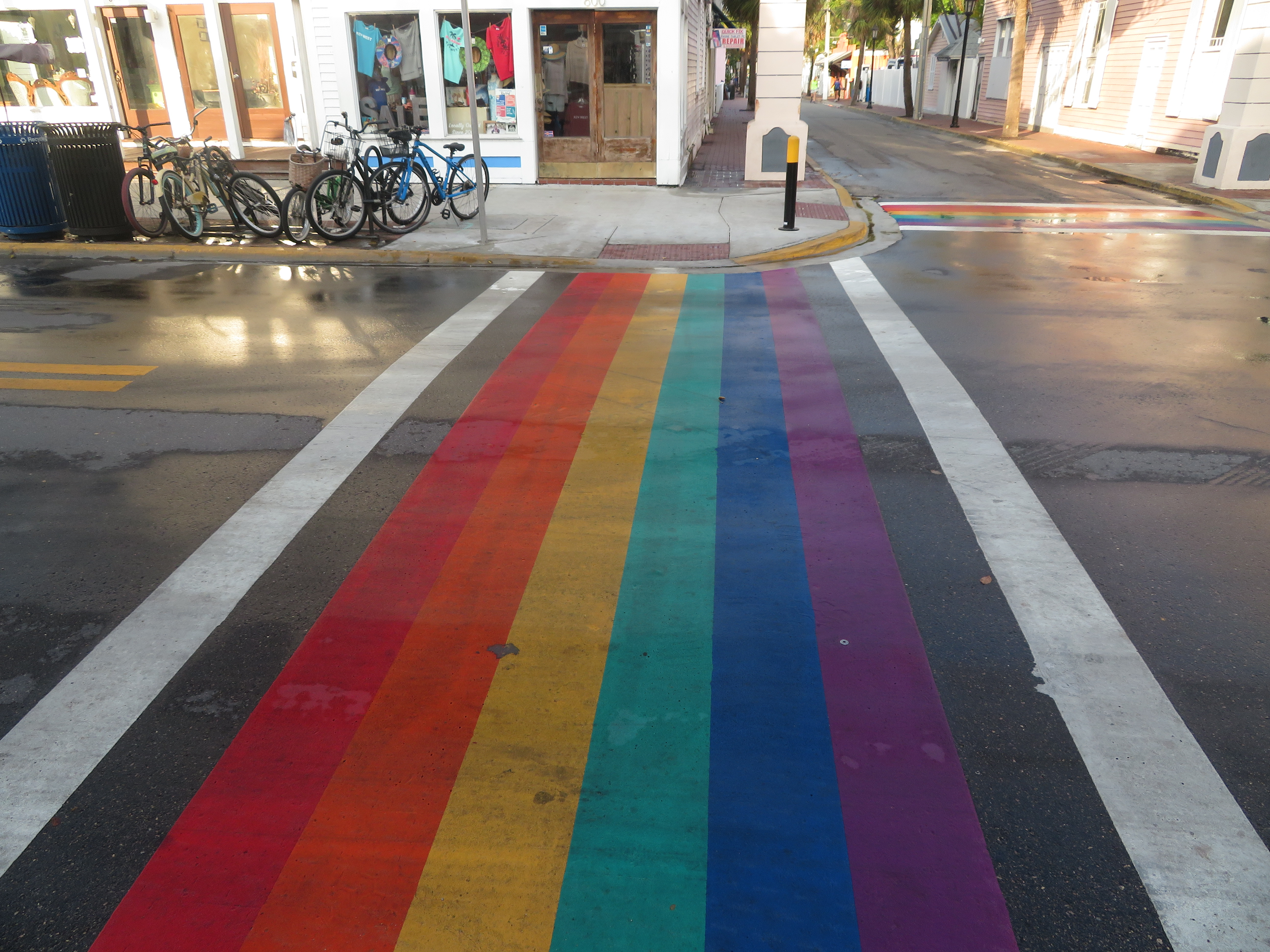
Rainbow crosswalk on Duval Street in Key West

In 2015, Key West installed its original rainbow crosswalk at the intersection of Duval and Petronia street, at all four corners.

In 2020, pre-formed thermoplastic color stripes were installed at the Duval and Petronia intersection to make the rainbow crosswalks more permanent.

On August 15th, 2025, Brain Barroso, City manager of Key West, received a letter from the Florida Department of Transportation to remove the rainbow crosswalks at Duval and Petronia street by September 3rd, or FDOT would remove the crosswalks themselves and bill all associated costs to the city, with any additional violations leading to state funds being withheld.

On September 8th, 2025, the City of Key West was issued a final order from FDOT.

On September 9th, 2025, the rainbow crosswalks were painted black.

The first official installation of rainbow crossings in Florida were painted in Key West in 2015 on Duval Street.

== Gainesville ==
Three rainbow crosswalks were constructed in Gainesville on October 11, 2019 in front of the Tax Collector's Building, in front of the Hippodrome Theater, and in front of City Hall.

They were funded by The Pride Community Center of North Central Florida with a goal of $7,000 USD.

The director of The Pride Community Center of North Central Florida, Terry Fleming, wanted to put the crosswalks in for a sense of visibility, community, and support, ideas often entrenched in the creation of rainbow crosswalks.

The crosswalks remained in place until August 25, 2025, when they were removed in response to the Florida Department of Transportation threatening to withhold transportation funds unless they were removed.

Some of the bricks that were used in the crosswalks were saved and implemented in a renovated City Hall plaza, which opened on May 8, 2026.

== Miami Beach ==
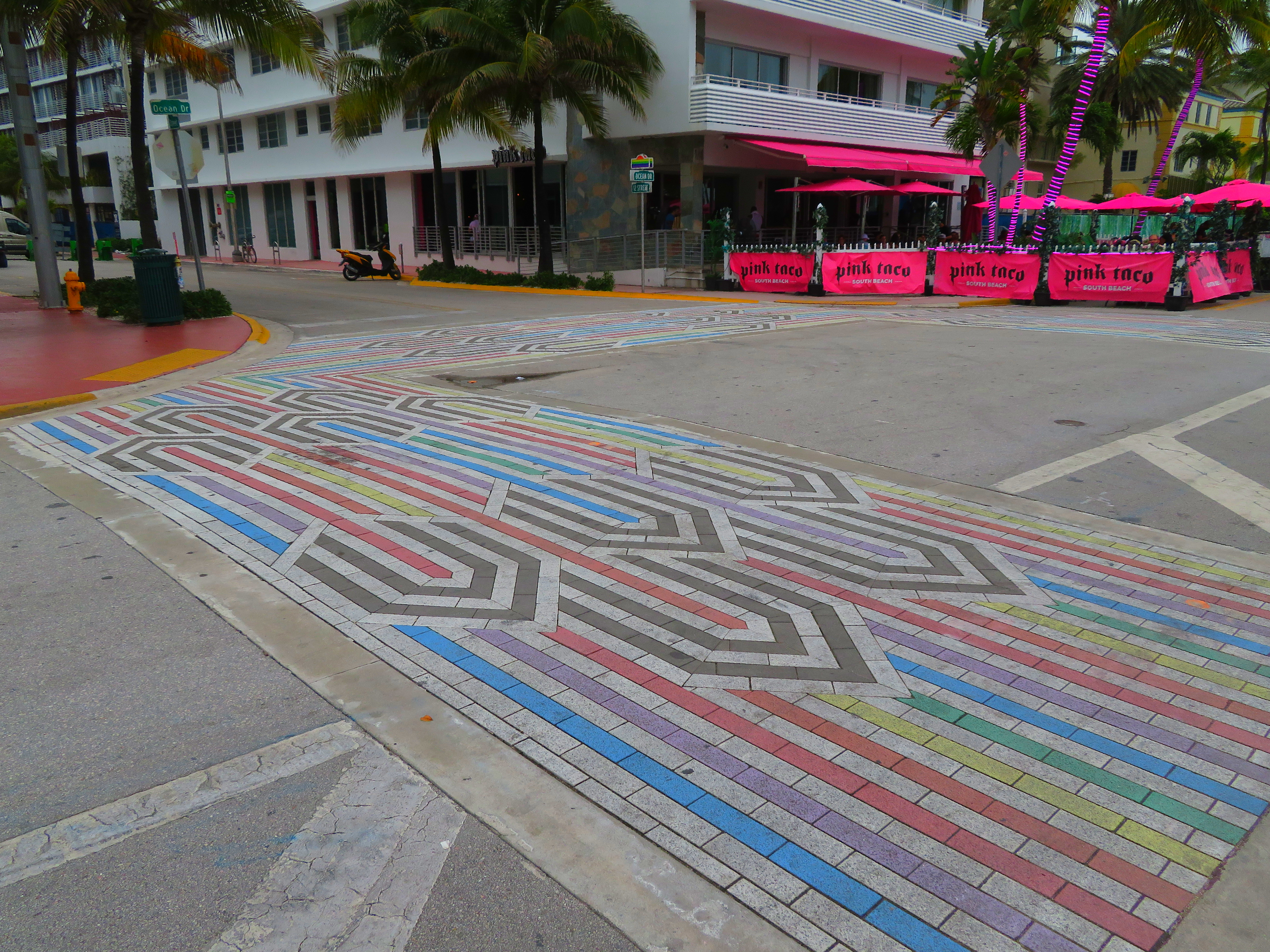
The Rainbow Crossing in the neighberhood of South Beach, in Miami Beach, Florida. The crossing was installed in November 2018 and then removed in October 2025. Photo taken 2021

Miami Beach has crosswalks with rainbow-colored pavers.

== Orlando ==
A rainbow-colored crossing was installed in Orlando, to honor the victims from the Pulse nightclub shooting that occurred on June 12, 2016. An online petition was signed by approximately 2,700 citizens requesting to have it painted nearby the nightclub museum. Approved by the Florida Department of Transportation (FDOT), the project ended up costing about $2,900 with the installation beginning on October 10 and completed the next day on October 11, 2017. The artwork was painted over by FDOT on August 21, 2025. Soon afterwards, people colored the sidewalk with chalk as law enforcement watched and warned them to stay out of the street.

== St. Petersburg ==
St. Petersburg had a rainbow intersection that was installed in July 2020. On August 21, 2025, the city sent a letter to the Florida Department of Transportation requesting that five Rainbow Crossings be allowed to stay because they "create a strong sense of community and make roads safer." On August 22, they agreed to remove the street art including the one in front of the Woodson African American Museum of Florida. In December 2025, the city installed 11 rainbow themed bike racks near the intersection where the crossings were removed.

== Tampa ==
Tampa had to remove 47 street art locations in 2025 or lose transportation funding from the state.

== West Palm Beach ==
A rainbow crossing was created in West Palm Beach in 2021. Plans to remove the painting were announced in 2025 and the removal was done on August 25. There are also plans to 'relocate and reimagine' the crossing to the planned Serenity Park in Northwood Village.

== See also ==
- Art destruction
- Rainbow crossings in California
