= Rainbow crossing =

LGBTQ symbol

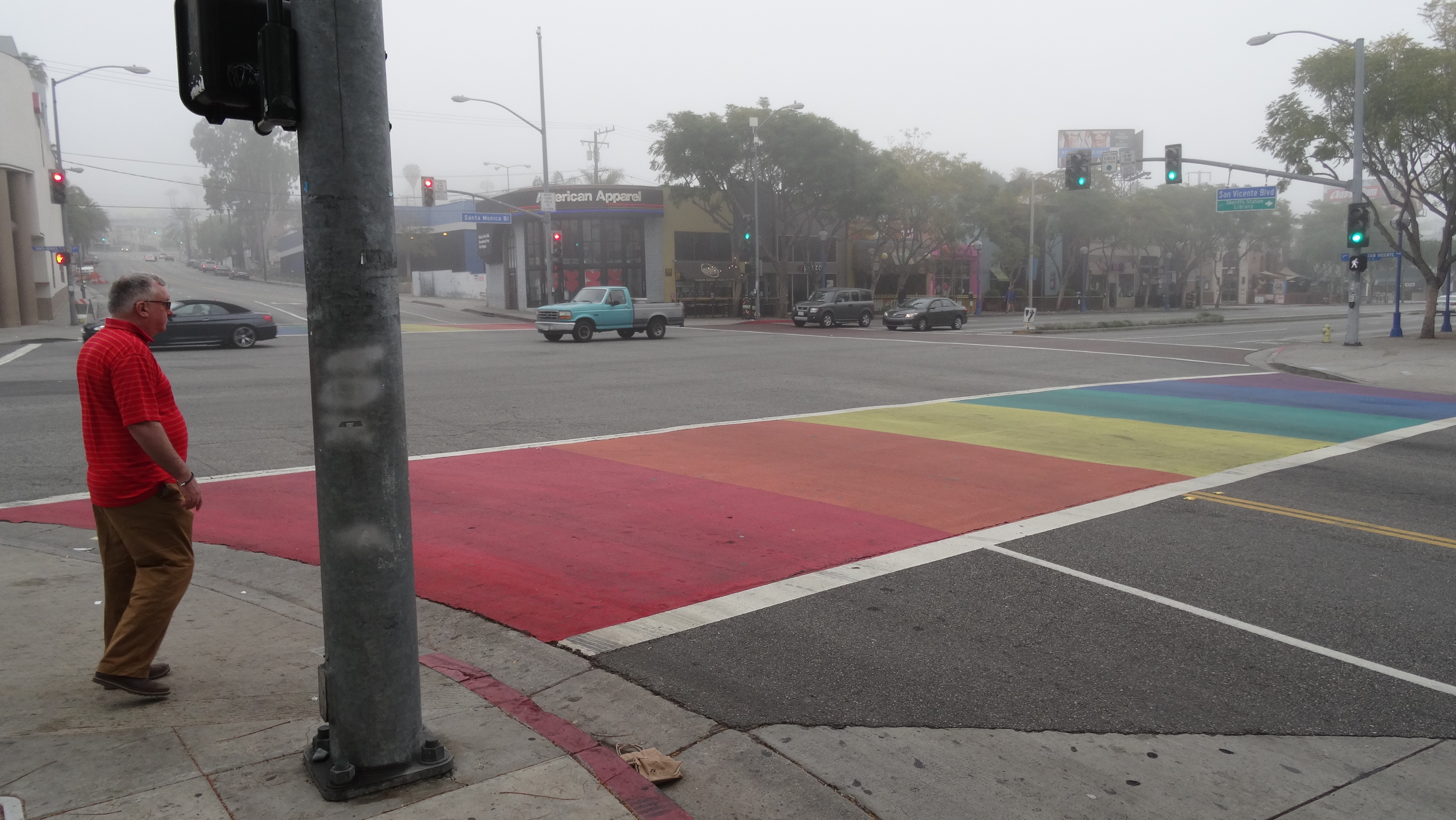
The first permanent rainbow crossing in the world was installed in time for the LA Pride Parade in June 2012. The crossing sits alongside the LA Pride Parade route on Santa Monica Boulevard, West Hollywood. Photo taken in 2016.

A rainbow crossing or rainbow crosswalk is a pedestrian crossing that has the art of the rainbow flag installed to celebrate the LGBTQ+ community.

Rainbow crossings may be installed just for particular occasions, such as events or Pride parades while others may be permanent fixtures of cities, especially when they are installed in gay villages.

== History ==
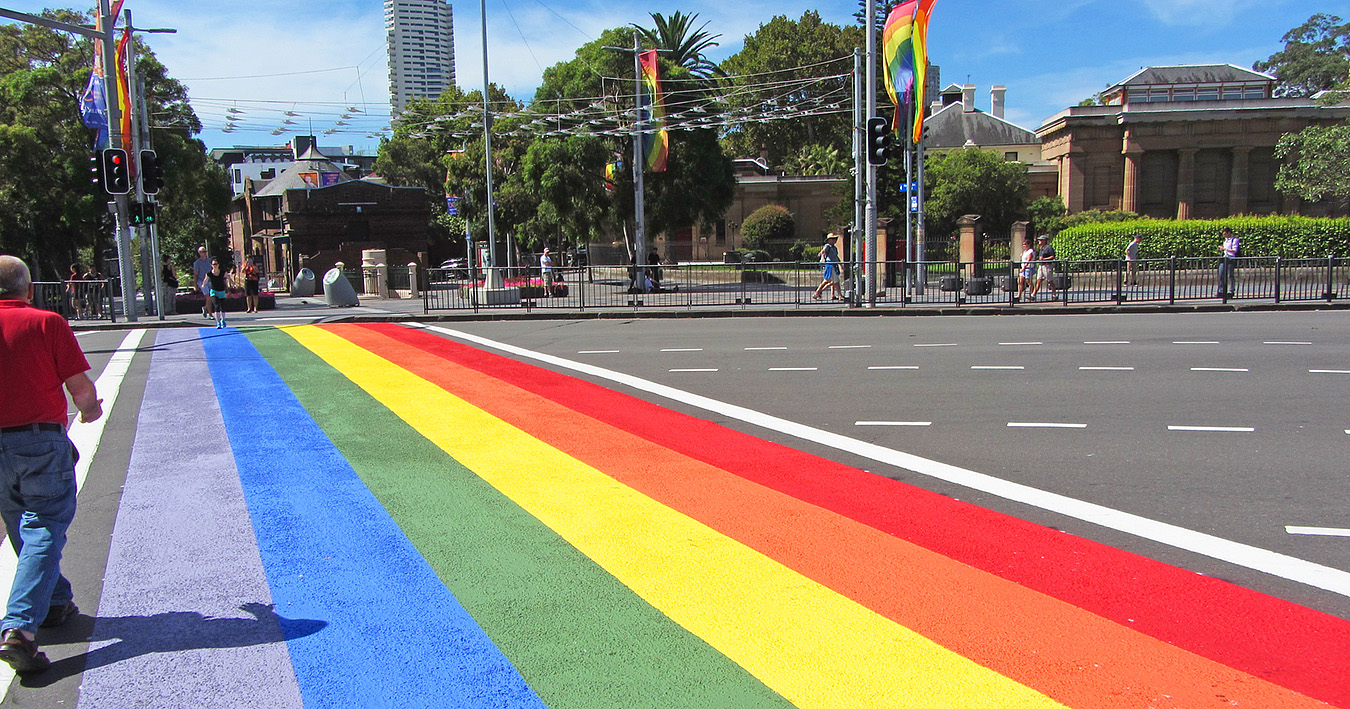
The first temporary Rainbow Crossing in Australia on Oxford St at Taylor Square in Sydney. It was first installed in February 2013 for the Sydney Gay and Lesbian Mardi Gras and then removed in April 2013.

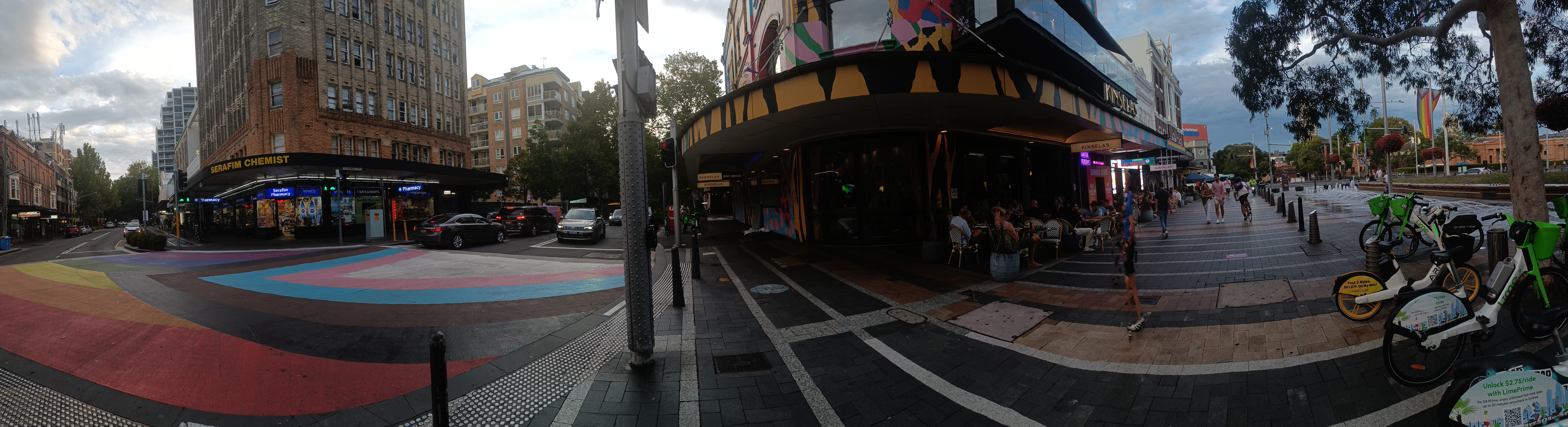
In 2019 a new permanent rainbow crossing was installed at the southern end of Taylor Square just 50 metres from where the original temporary crossing had been on Oxford st. It was updated in 2024 to include the progress pride flag. 2026

The rainbow flag or gay pride flag, is associated around the world as being a symbol of the LGBTQ community.

The idea to create a rainbow crossing appears to have first emerged in Taipei, Taiwan, in 2008. The first permanent rainbow crossing in the world was installed in time for the LA Pride Parade in June 2012 and there were two crossings that were installed on parallel sides of the road and the crossings sit alongside the LA Pride Parade route on Santa Monica Boulevard, West Hollywood.

In 2013 the Lord Mayor of Sydney commented that the rainbow crossing in West Hollywood inspired her to create a rainbow crossing in Darlinghurst, Sydney for the Sydney Gay and Lesbian Mardi Gras, and there have also been temporary rainbow crossings in other cities such as Tel Aviv for a photo shoot to promote TYP: Ivri Lider and Johnny Goldstein, the act scheduled to headline the Gay Pride Parade's main concert. These photos, reminiscent of the Beatles Abbey Road album cover were posted on Facebook and the crosswalk was repainted white a few hours later.

Following some of the temporary and early permanent installations in 2012 and 2013, the symbolism of rainbow crossings has gained widespread adoption by cities around the world to celebrate the LGBTQ community with many having been made into permanent installations. With that they have also been subject to regular attacks and vandalism by people opposed to them.

The first rainbow crossing in New Zealand was installed in Beach street Queenstown in 2018, and as of 2026 there are five permanent rainbow crossings in New Zealand.

== Community protests and internet activism ==
=== DIY Rainbow crossing protest movement in Australia ===
The DIY rainbow crossing movement was a protest movement that emerged in Sydney, Australia, in 2013 that involved people creating rainbow pedestrian crossings in chalk as well as engaging in internet activism to protest the removal of a rainbow crossing from Oxford Street Darlinghurst in the LGBTQIA+ district of Sydney.

The first rainbow crossing in Australia was created on Oxford st in the LGBTQIA+ suburb of Darlinghurst, in Sydney by the City of Sydney as part of the 35th-anniversary celebrations for the Sydney Mardi Gras and lasted from the 25 February 2013 to 10 April 2013. It has been commented that the "Rainbow crosswalks on Santa Monica Boulevard in West Hollywood were Lord Mayor Clover Moore's inspiration... ...[and] council hoped that the crossing would be just as successful as those on Santa Monica Boulevard and that public opinion would persuade the New South Wales roads minister to allow the crossing to remain in place."

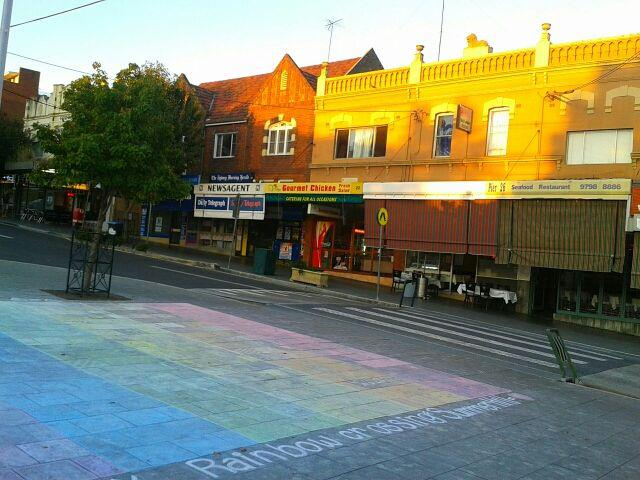
The Summer Hill Rainbow Crossing. 2013

On 14 April 2013, members of the community from several local schools chalked a rainbow in the public square at Lackey St, Summer Hill, as part of the DIY Rainbow Crossing movement, and on 15 April 2013, Ashfield Council workers removed the rainbow and the council issued a statement labelling it a slip hazard and requesting a permit be obtained before it could be re-chalked.

On 17 April 2013, it was rechalked by more than 100 people, including Ashfield local councillor Alex Lofts after an art permit was obtained and on 18 April, it was again removed. The rainbow was re-chalked again and since 18 April it has now remained chalked with a group of local community members and supporters continuing to chalk in the rainbow, especially after rain. This group also hold occasional performances and arts-related celebrations at the site and some local businesses have offered discounts and support for the rainbow with these businesses display a logo with a stylised image of the rainbow crossing on it. A Summer Hill Rainbow Crossing Facebook page was also used to support the community protest.

At an Ashfield Council meeting on 28 May 2013, the council passed a motion that a permanent outline of a rainbow be painted in Summer Hill Square, with the understanding that this may be periodically 'chalked in' by community members and on 3 November 2013 this outline was installed in the square becoming New South Wales first permanent rainbow crossing.

Following the removal of the temporary crossing on Oxford st the City of Sydney installed a rainbow flag at Taylor Square in Darlinghurst in 2014and in 2019 a permanent rainbow crossing was installed in the southern end of Taylor Square 30 metres from where the original temporary Rainbow crossing was located. The permanent rainbow crossing at Taylor square sits on the border between Darlinghurst and Surry Hills and this crossing was updated in 2024 to include the Progress Pride flag. In 2025 a second permanent Rainbow crossing with the Progress Pride flag was installed at the northern end Taylor Square, in front of the new LGBTQIA+ museum Qtopia.

=== Wider adoption of the protest movement ===
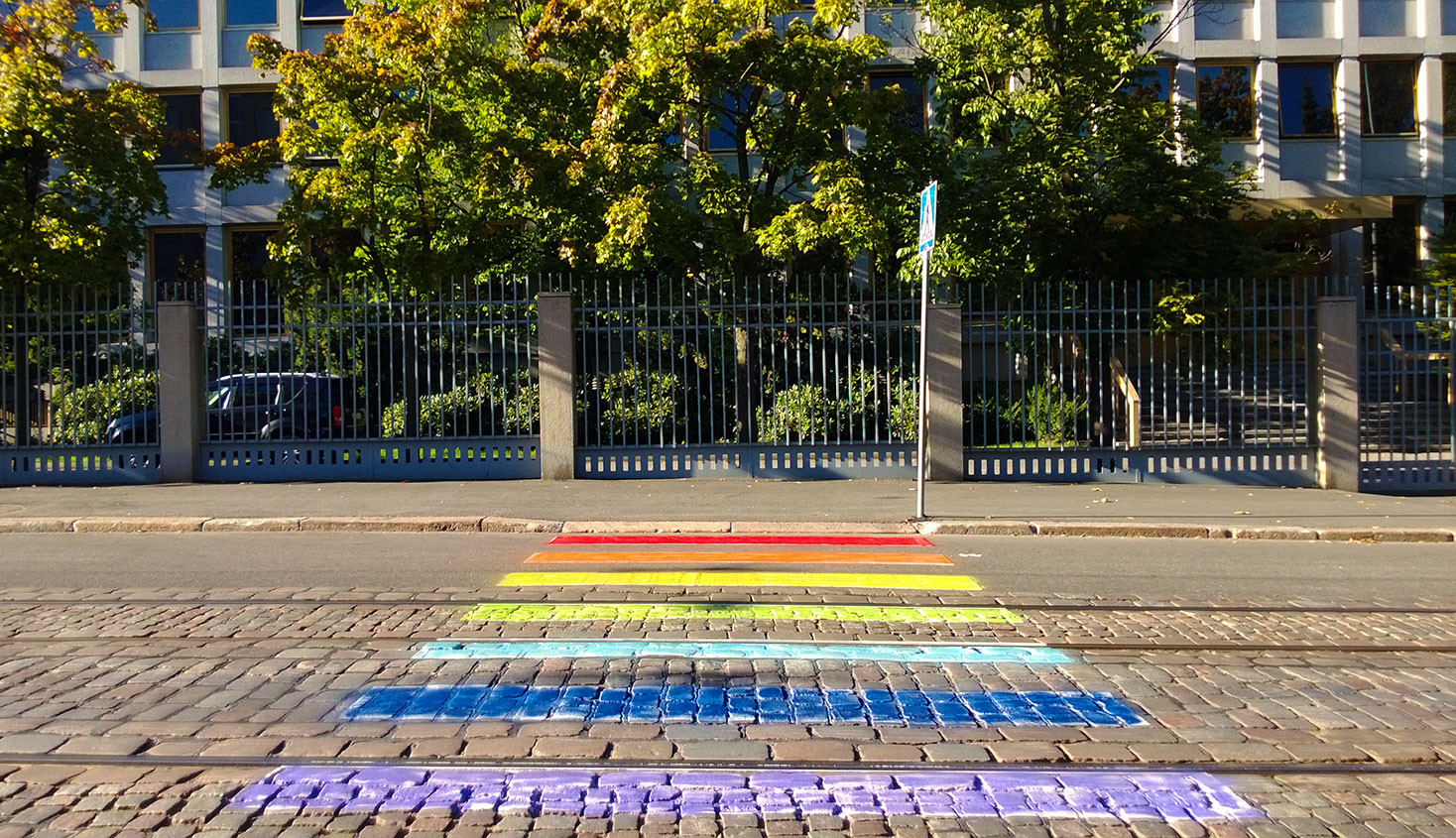
In June 2013, a new law was passed in Russia which banned the distribution of "propaganda of non-traditional sexual relationships" towards minors. In response to this new law, in August and September 2013 the Russian embassies in Stockholm, Oslo and Helsinki all had Rainbow crossings painted on the road outside of the embassy buildings by activists.

The original DIY rainbow crossing protest movement that was generated by the removal of the rainbow crossing in Darlinghurst, Sydney has also appeared in other forms of protest elsewhere around the world.

==== Russia ====
In June 2013, a new law was passed in Russia which banned the distribution of "propaganda of non-traditional sexual relationships" towards minors and it was argued that the law was broad enough so that it would ban any public display of LGBTQ+ symbols in Russia and suppress LGBTQ+ culture. In 2023 a law was passed in Russia that officially criminalized any expression of support for the LGBTQIA+ movement in Russia and designated the "international LGBT movement" an "extremist" group.

In August and September 2013 the Russian embassies in Stockholm, Oslo and Helsinki all had Rainbow crossings painted on the road outside of the embassy buildings by activists in response to this new law passed in June 2013. In all three cities the Russian embassy buildings already had zebra crosings on the road outside of the buildings and the activists painted over the top of them in rainbow colours. In Helsinki the activists returned the night after they had painted the zebra crossing and staged a kiss-in in front of the Russian embassy. In Stockholm the activists returned to the rainbow crossing and walked naked across it whilst they were having their photo taken by other activists and they also stood outside the embassy wearing only underwear and dressed up in drag. One of these activists in Stockholm who was wearing only a tight fitting pair of shiny blue underwear also pole danced upside down on a street sign pole outside of the embassy.

== Rainbow Path ==
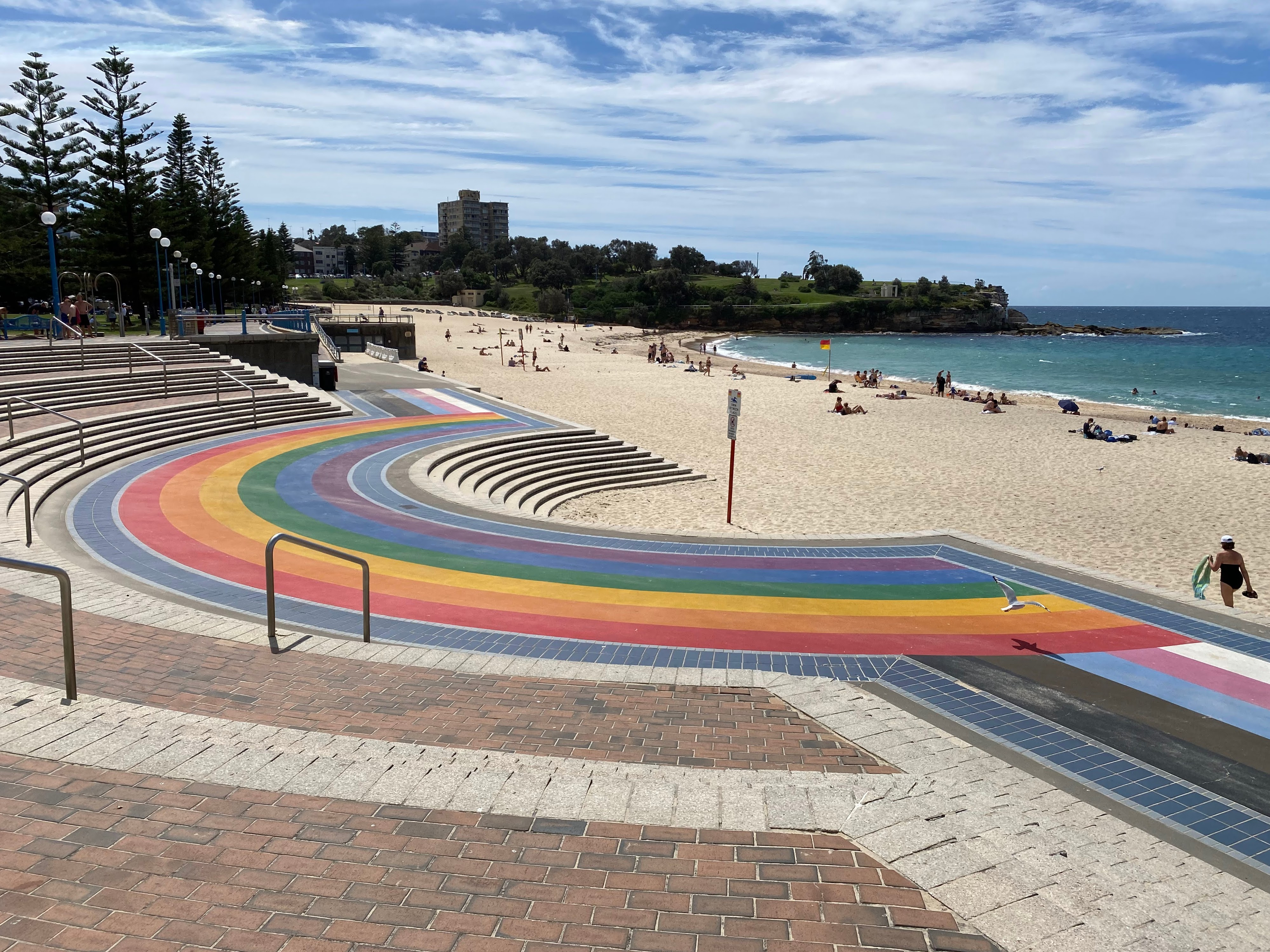
Rainbow footpath at Coogee beach in Sydney. 2023.

Rainbow paths are very similar to rainbow crossings with the main difference being they do not exist on roads but on footpaths, cycleways and in public parks. In 2016 Australia's first permanent rainbow path was installed in Light Square in Adelaide and in 2021 rainbow paths were installed in Prince Alfred Park in Sydney and along the footpath adjacent to Coogee Beach in Sydney with the path in Prince Alfred Park becoming permanent. The rainbow path in Prince Alfred Park was updated in 2024 to include the Progress Pride Flag.

In prepearation for Sydney hosting World Pride in 2023 new temporary rainbow paths were installed in Waterman's Cove in Barangaroo and in Kensington street, Chippendale.

In 2017 in Mount Albert, Auckland a Rainbow path was installed that stretched for almost 500 metres along a cycle route, and in 2021 a 570-metre rainbow path was installed along a bicycle route in Utrecht, running through Utrecht university.

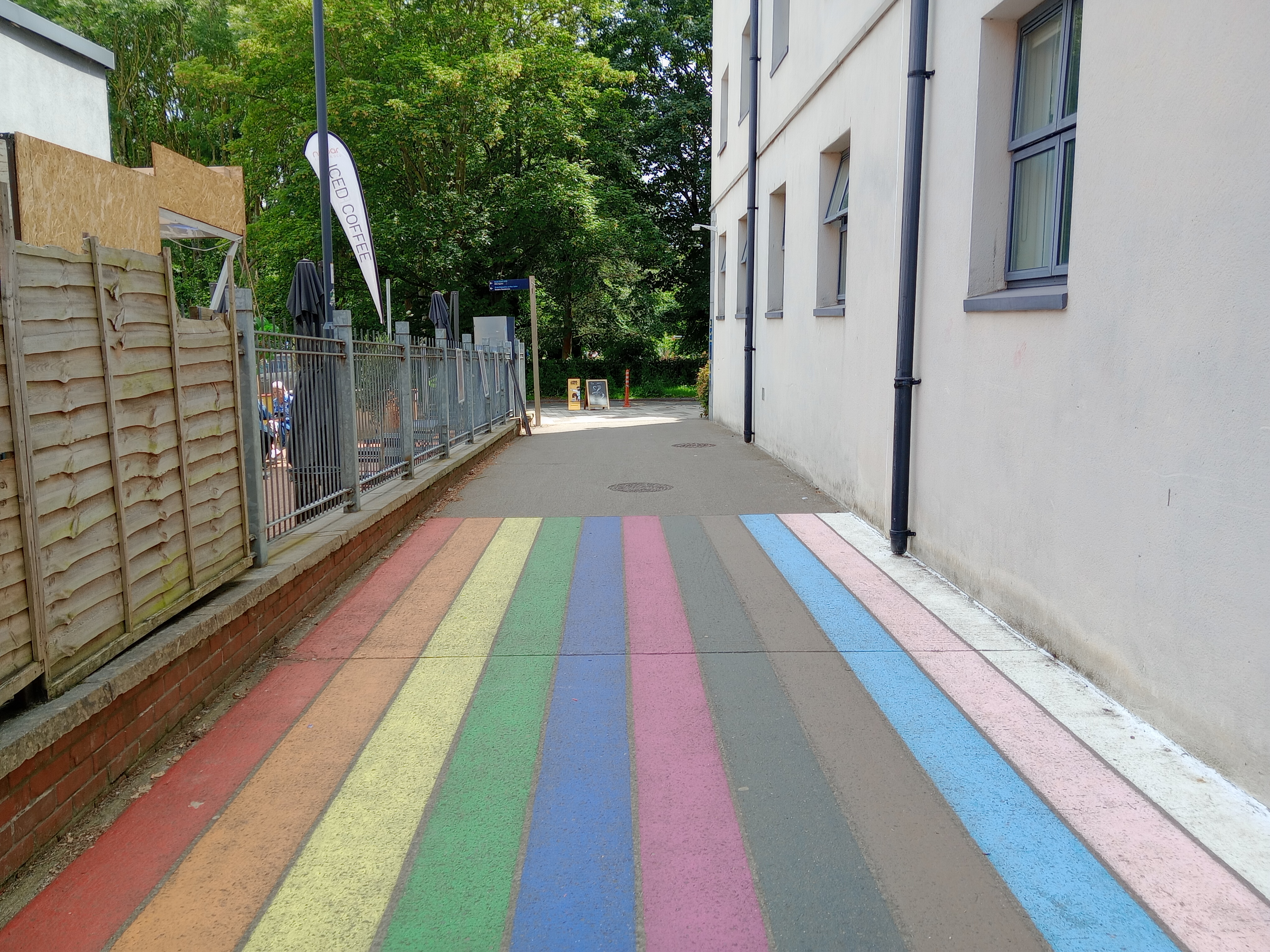
Rainbow footpath at Dublin City University main campus

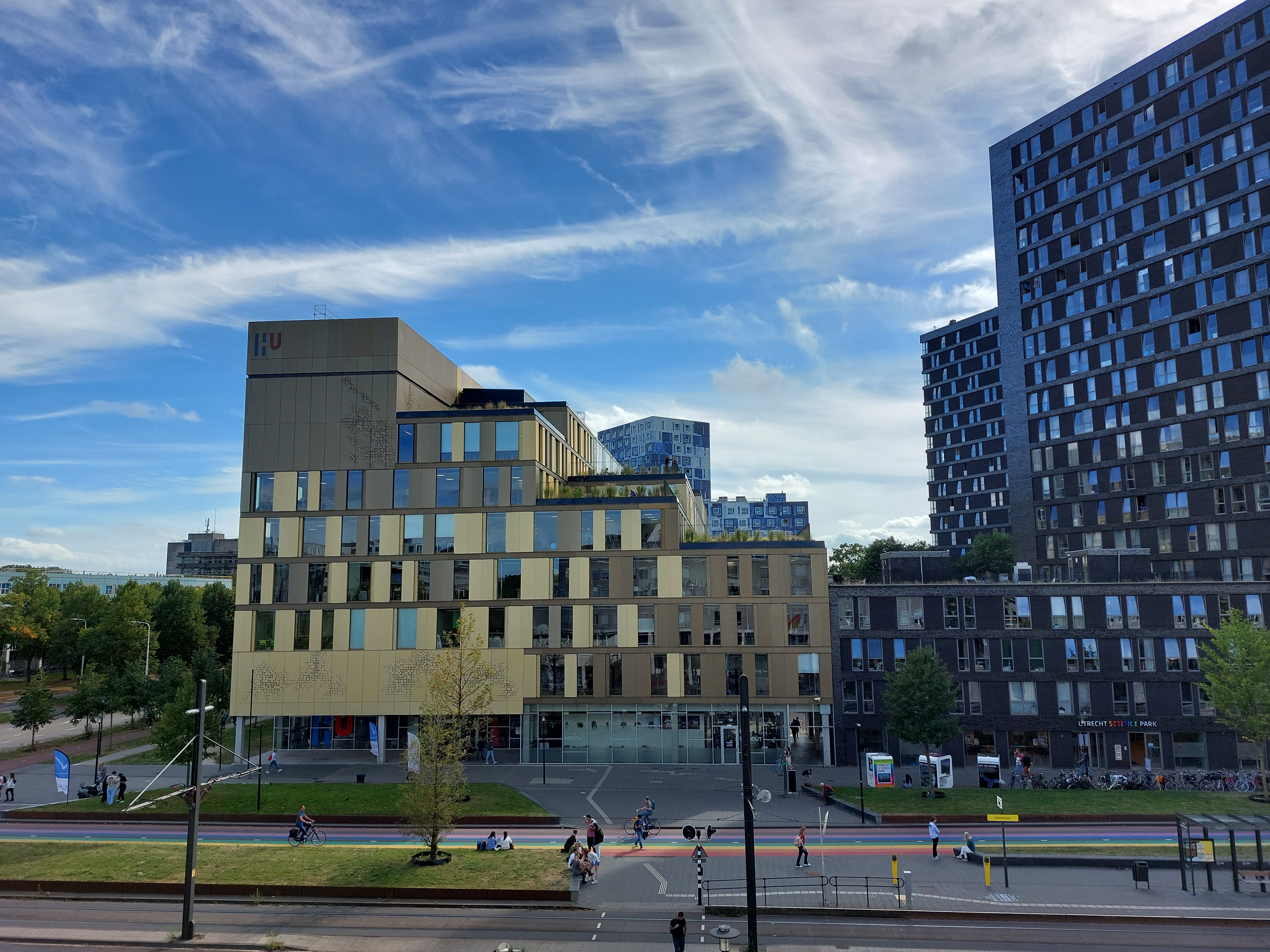
A 570-metre long rainbow bike lane at Utrecht university in the Netherlands. 2022

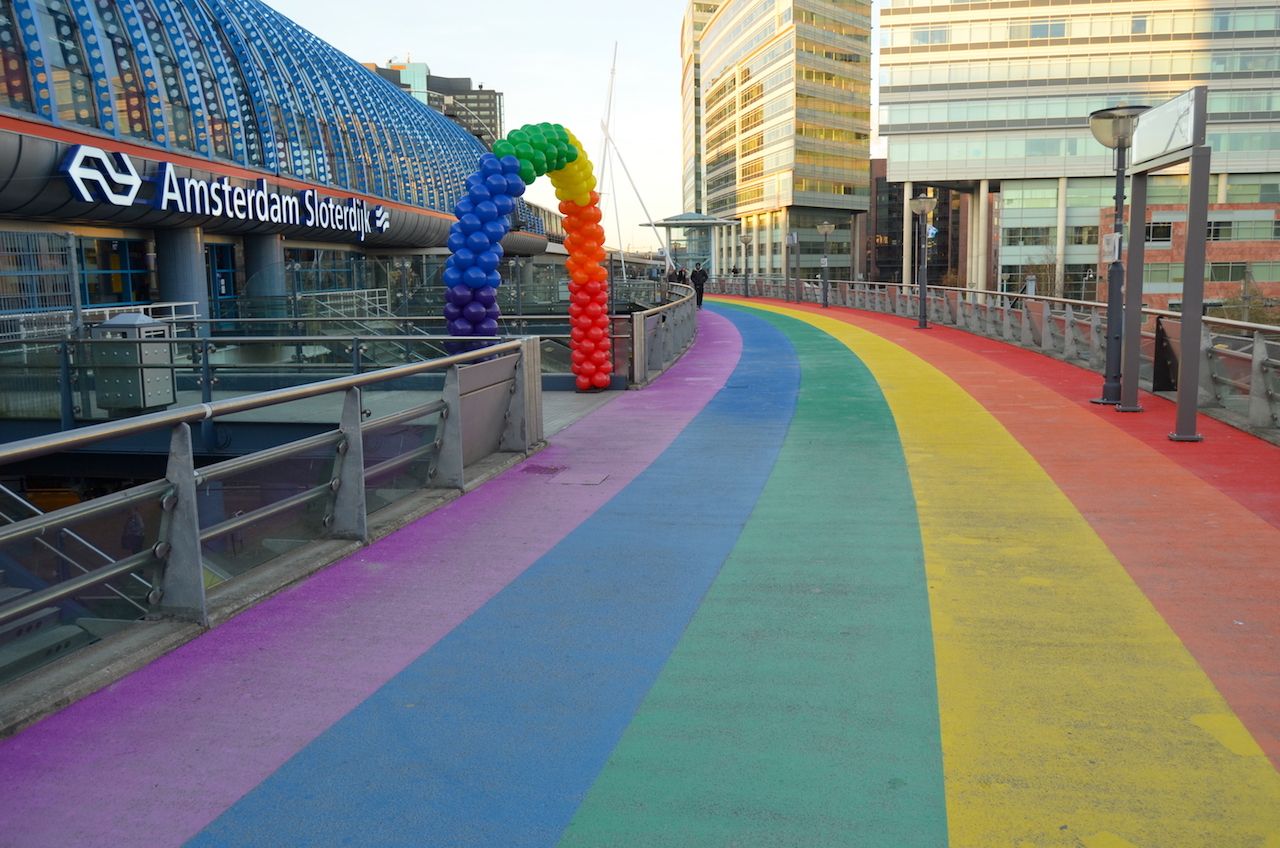
Rainbow footpath at a train station in Amsterdam. 2026.

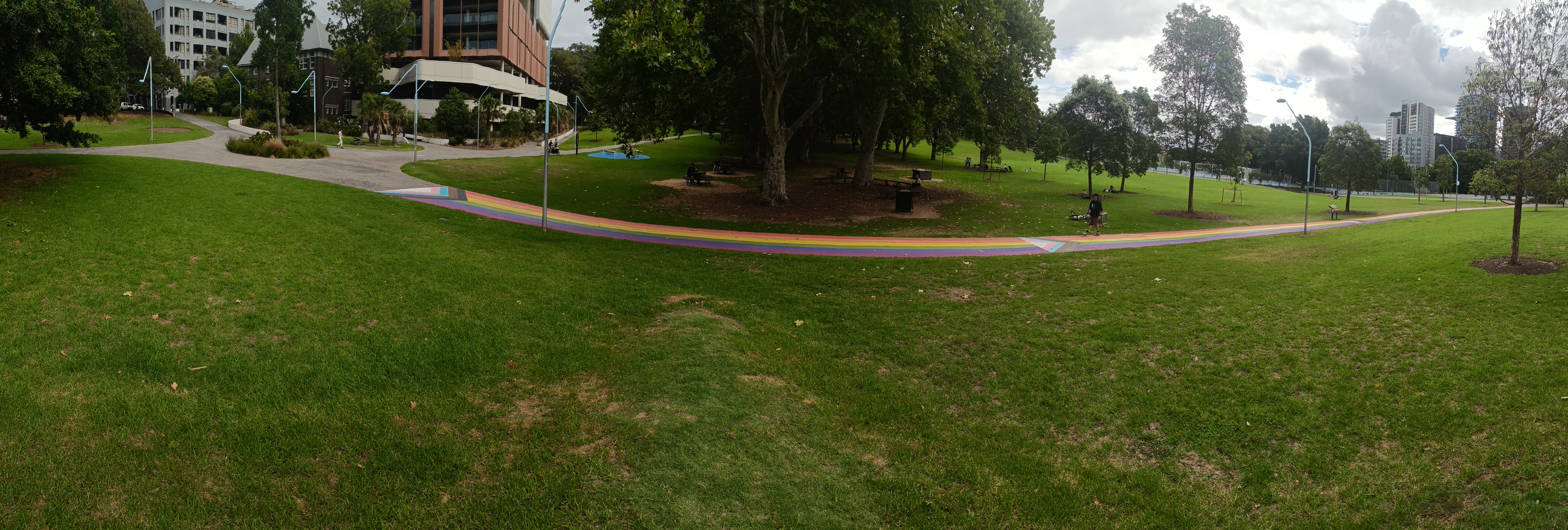
A rainbow path in Prince Alfred Park, in Surry Hills, Sydney. 2026

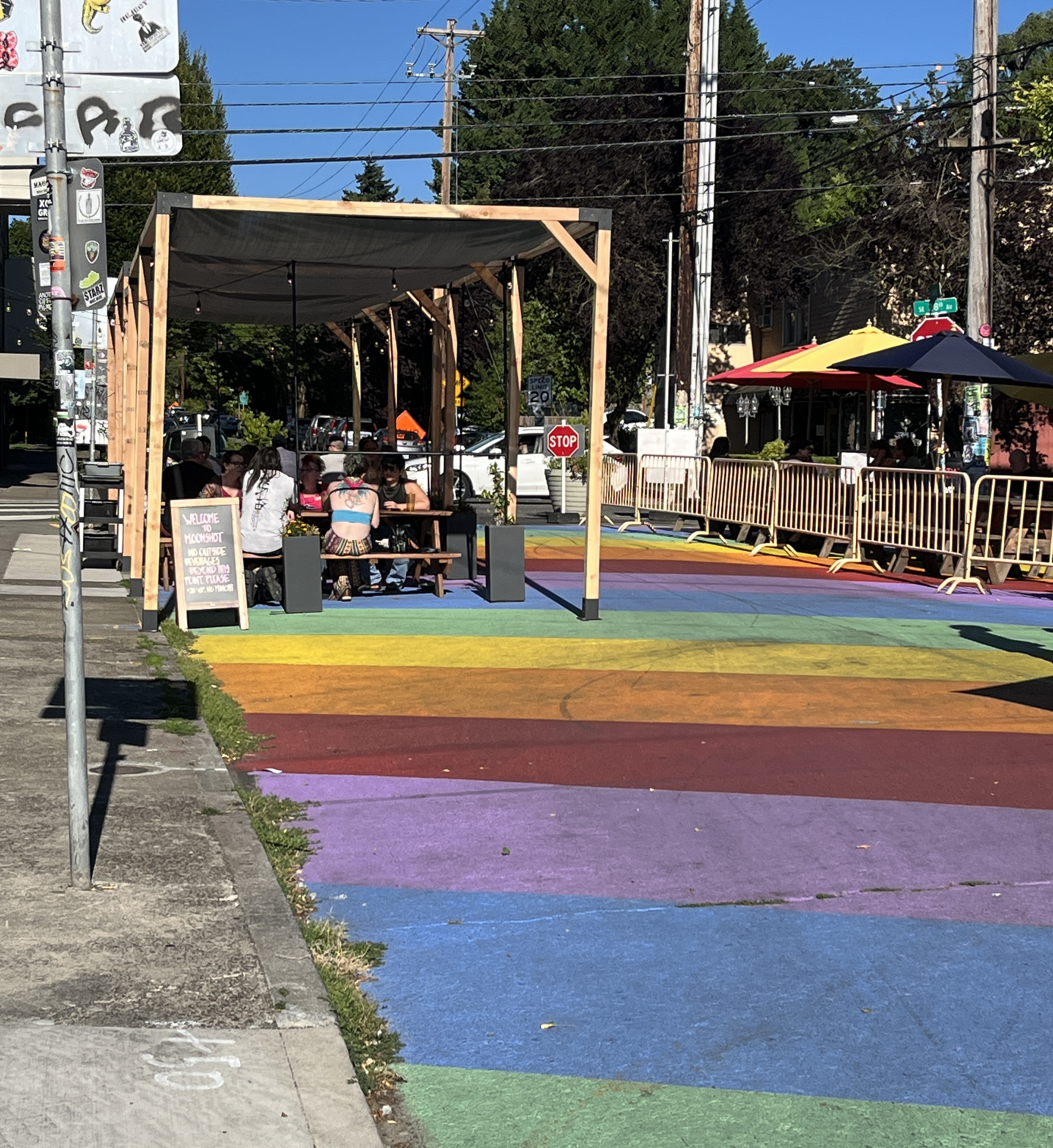
Ankeny Rainbow Road plaza. Portland, 2025

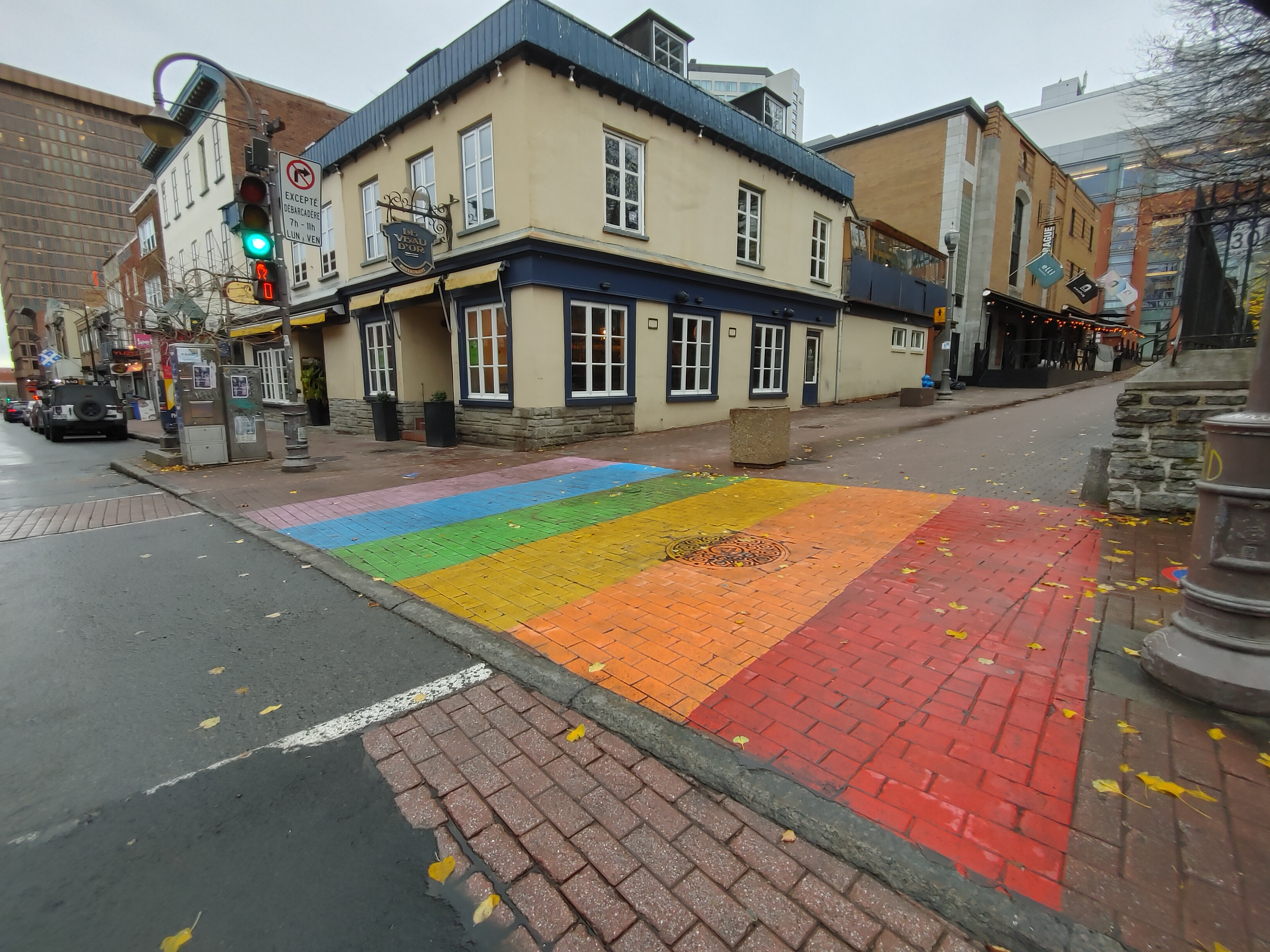
Rainbow footpath in Québec City, Canada. 2022.

== Pedestrian safety ==
In 2011, the United States Federal Highway Administration advised, without data, that "crosswalk art is actually contrary to the goal of increased safety and most likely could be a contributing factor to a false sense of security for both motorists and pedestrians".

In early September 2019, the city council of Ames, Iowa, cut the ribbon on a rainbow crosswalk. Subsequently, the Federal Highway Administration sent them a letter "requesting" that it be removed. The city council ignored the letter.

Since then, the 11th edition of the US Manual on Uniform Traffic Control Devices discourages bright colors from use within a crosswalk but no longer prohibits them, provided that the colors are not standard for use in other traffic control applications. However, symbols in addition to the rainbow may not be permissible depending on the application.

In the United Kingdom, the Royal National Institute of Blind People (RNIB) has complained about the risk of rainbow crossings for people with visual impairments, who may rely on the contrast between traditional black and white stripes in order to cross the road safely.

Other disability groups have said that people with dementia or learning disabilities may not recognise that they are road crossings, or that the colours may be overwhelming for autistic people or guide dogs. In response to an open letter by the RNIB, the Alzheimer's Society and Scope, London mayor Sadiq Khan temporarily paused the crossings.

A 2022 study by Bloomberg Philanthropies found that 17 sites with asphalt art had a 17% reduction in crashes and a 50% reduction in crashes with pedestrians after their painting; though, the study does not mention rainbow crossings explicitly. An analysis of decorative crosswalks in Orlando, Florida, found more pedestrian crossings after their installation alongside a decrease in dangerous driving behaviors.

== Defacement and vandalism ==
Rainbow crossings around the world have been regular targets of homophobic attacks and vandalism such as defacement.

In early June 2019, the city of Albuquerque, New Mexico, unveiled a rainbow crosswalk on the historic U.S. Route 66. Just a few days later, a motorcycle gang caused a significant amount of damage to the $30,000 crossing with their motorcycles.

In August 2022, police in Atlanta arrested a suspect that was said to have defaced the city's rainbow crosswalk by painting swastikas over it.

In October 2022, the Royal Canadian Mounted Police investigated a potential hate crime after a severed pig's head was found on a rainbow crosswalk outside a school near Spruce Grove, Alberta.

In February 2024, a rainbow crosswalk in Redmond, Washington, was defaced by vandals with slurs using spraypaint.

In March 2024, a rainbow crossing in Gisborne, New Zealand, was painted white by members of Destiny Church. They attempted to paint it again after it was restored and five were arrested. A rainbow crossing on Karangahape Road in Auckland was subsequently defaced in the same manner, but Destiny Church denied involvement.

In June 2024, a video showed a pickup truck doing burnouts on a newly installed rainbow crossing in Huntington, West Virginia.

== Bans ==
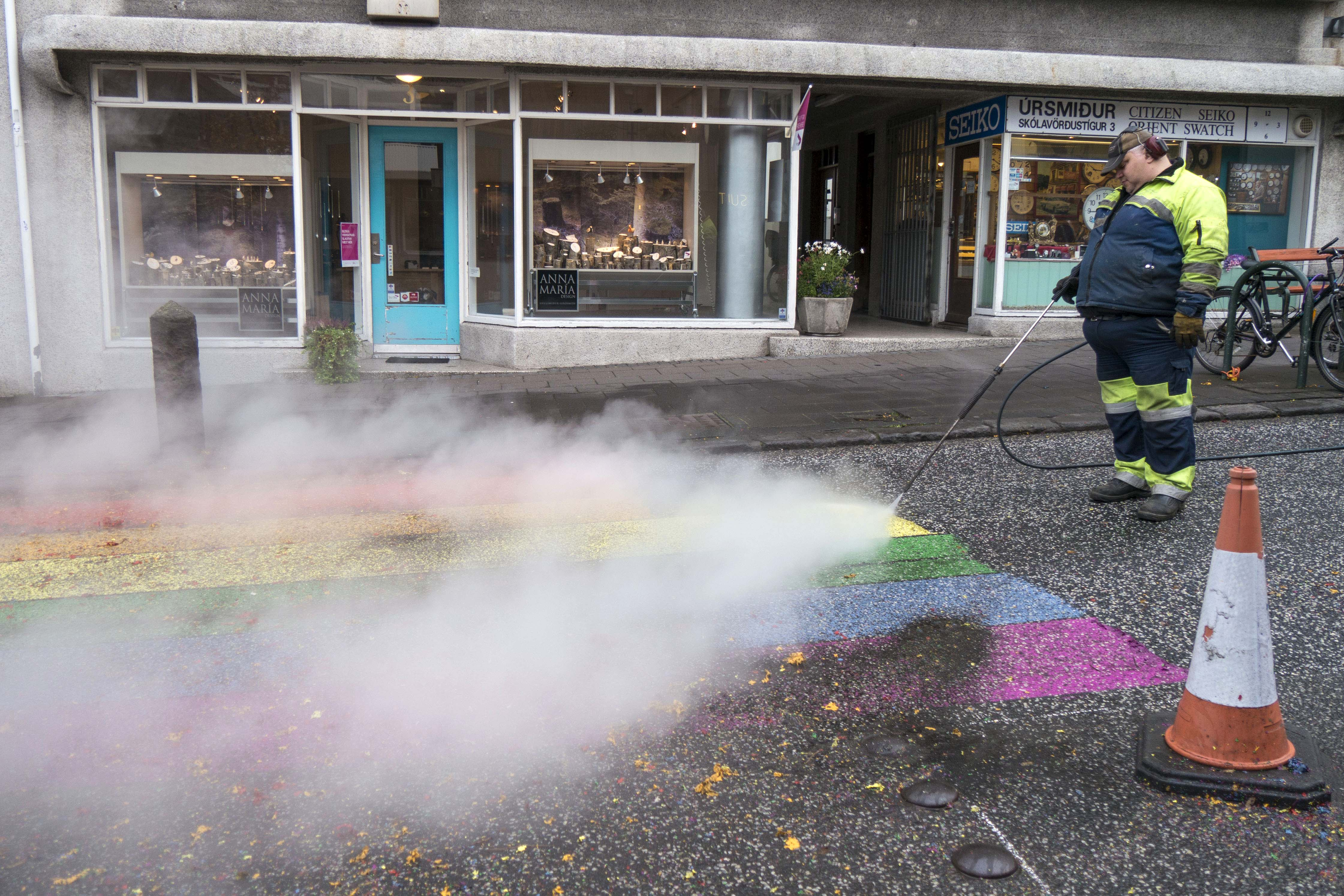
Removal of a rainbow crossing in Iceland

On 22 February 2024, a by-law was passed by referendum in the Canadian town of Westlock, Alberta, which prohibits the painting of crosswalks with non-standard colors, or the flying of flags on municipal property that represent "political, social, or religious movements or commercial entities". The referendum was proposed by petition, with its supporters claiming that it was meant to promote governmental "neutrality" on social issues.

The bill's passage was criticized by Westlock's mayor and other local politicians, who believed that it was specifically meant to restrict LGBTQ pride commemorations by the municipal government. A rainbow crossing had been painted in Westlock for the first time in 2023, but was subsequently removed to comply with the neutrality bill.

Later that year, a similar by-law inspired by the Wastlock ban was passed in Barrhead, Alberta, while groups have advocated for similar laws in other Canadian municipalities.

=== Rainbow crossing ban in Florida ===
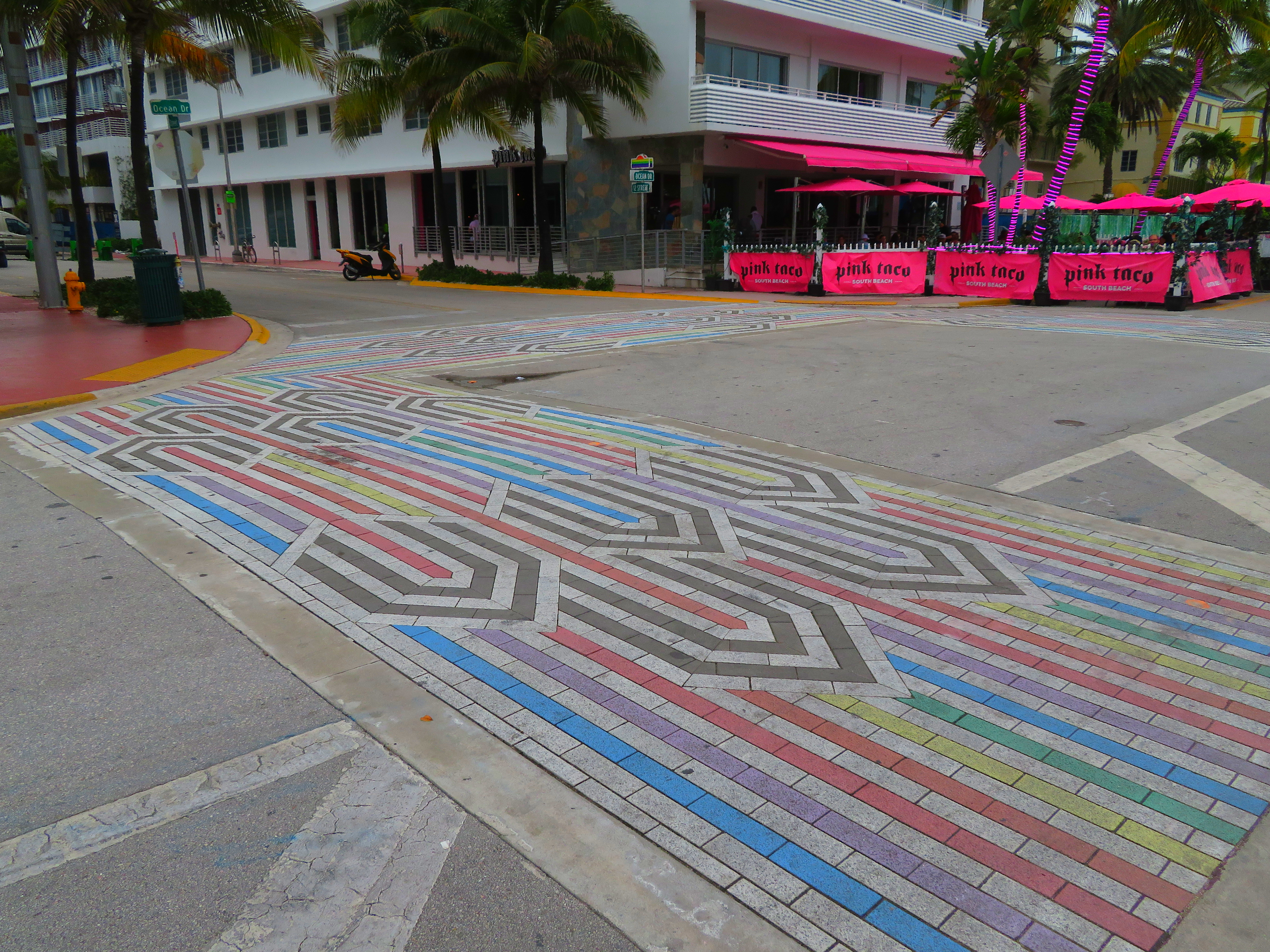
The Rainbow Crossing in the neighborhood of South Beach, in Miami Beach, Florida. The crossing was installed in November 2018 and then removed in October 2025. Photo taken 2021.

In March 2025, the US state of Florida officially prohibited new installations of all aesthetic and non-standard crosswalk markings on the state highway system, which includes rainbow crossings. In June 2025, a new las was signed by Florida Governor Ron DeSantis to keep "...our transportation facilities free & clear of political ideologies." and following this on June the 30th 2025 a memo released by the Florida Department of Transportation specified that the rainbow crossings were to be removed on the basis of safety concerns for pedestrians and removal of the rainbow crossings began in August 2025 .

A rainbow crossing in Orlando, painted in 2017 to honor the victims of the Pulse nightclub shooting, was removed in August 2025 and in the neighborhood of South Beach located in the city of Miami Beach, a rainbow crossing that was installed in November 2018 was removed in October 2025. When the original rainbow coloured paving bricks that made up the South Beach crossing were removed the Miami city council collected the bricks and some of them were then repurposed to create a new rainbow pedestrian path close to where the rainbow crossing had been and as well as this Rainbow flags were also hung near to where the rainbow crossing had been. In response to the removal of a rainbow crossing in St. Petersburg, in December 2025 the city council installed 11 rainbow colored bike racks in protest.

== List of rainbow crossings ==
This list below includes all rainbow crossings of notability but does not include all crossings in existence.

City	Country	Date installed	Location	Image	Notability	Ref.
Los Angeles	United States	2012	West Hollywood		First permanent rainbow crossing in the world and the first in the United States and California. The two rainbow crosswalks were painted on the intersection of San Vicente Boulevard and Santa Monica Boulevard in time for the LA Pride Parade in June 2012. They were updated in 2022.	
Sydney	Australia	2013	Taylor Square, Oxford st, Darlinghurst		First temporary rainbow crossing in Australia, lasting from February to April 2013, for the Sydney Gay and Lesbian Mardi Gras.	
Sydney	Australia	2013	Lackey Street Piazza, Summer Hill		First permanent rainbow crossing in Australia.	
Vancouver	Canada	2013	Davie and Bute streets		First permanent rainbow crossing in Canada	
San Francisco	United States	2014	Castro District		First permanent installation in California's fourth largest city.	
Toronto	Canada	2014	Church and Alexander Streets		Main article: Rainbow crossing (Toronto) First permanent rainbow crossing in Ontario and largest city of Canada	
Seattle	United States	2015	Broadway and Pine Street, Capitol Hill, Seattle		Main article: Rainbow crossings in Seattle First permanent rainbow crossing in Washington state	
Philadelphia	United States	2015	13th & Locust streets		First permanent rainbow crossing in Pennsylvania	
Key West	United States	2015	Duval and Petronia streets		First permanent rainbow crossing in Florida originally painted in 2015 they were re-painted in 2020.	
San Jose	United States	2016			First rainbow crossing in San Jose.	
Swift Current	Canada	2017	Central Avenue		First permanent rainbow crossing in Saskatchewan	
Saskatoon	Canada	2017	Third Avenue and 23rd Street and Fourth Avenue		First permanent rainbow crossing in Saskatchewan's largest city	
Atlanta	United States	2017	Pedestrian scramble at 10th Street and Piedmont Avenue		First permanent rainbow crossing in Georgia, US	Swift Current
Darwin	Australia	2017	Knuckey and Smith Streets, Darwin city		The first rainbow crossing in the Northern Territory, installed for the city's pride week.	
Queenstown	New Zealand	2018	Beach st, Queenstown		First rainbow crossing in New Zealand.	
Paris	France	2018	Marais district		First permanent rainbow crossing in France	
Melbourne	Australia	2018	Jackson street, St Kilda		First rainbow crossing in the state of Victoria. Was expected to have lasted two years.	
Canberra	Australia	2018	Elouera and Lonsdale Streets, Braddon		First permanent rainbow roundabout in the world. First in the capital of Australia.	
Wellington	New Zealand	2018	Intersection of Dixon and Cuba st, Wellington		First rainbow crossing in Wellington.	
Milwaukee	United States	2018	N. Jefferson St.		First permanent rainbow crossing in Wisconsin	
Miami Beach	United States	2018	12th Street and Ocean Drive		The Crossing was notable for its prominence in the LGBTQIA+ district of South Beach in Miami Beach, Florida. The crossing was installed in November 2018 and then removed in October 2025.	
Sydney	Australia	2019	Taylor Square, corner of Campbell and Bourke streets, between Surry Hills and Darlinghurst.		Second permanent Rainbow crossing in Australia, notable for its size and prominence in the LGBTIQA+ district of Sydney.	
Nottingham	United Kingdom	2019	Broad Street		First permanent rainbow crossing in the United Kingdom.	
Guildford	United Kingdom	2019	Stag Hill, University of Surrey		First permanent rainbow crossing at a British university; installed after the council refused to allow rainbow crossings elsewhere in the county, as it is a crossing on private (university) land	
Vienna	Austria	2019	Burgtheater, Innere Stadt		First permanent rainbow crossing in Austria	
Chicago	United States	2019	North Halsted Street at West Buckingham Place		First permanent rainbow crossing in Illinois	
Venice	United States	2019			First rainbow crossing in Los Angeles	
Ferndale	United States	2019	Downtown Ferndale			
Taipei	Taiwan	2019	Ximending, Ximen Station Exit 6		Main article: Rainbow crossings in Taipei First permanent rainbow crossing in Taiwan; commemorates passing of marriage equality	
New York City	United States	2019	7th Avenue and Christopher Street		Near Stonewall Inn to celebrate the 50th anniversary of the Stonewall Riots (not officially permanent by any governing body, but has been consistently refurbished since 2019)	
New Plymouth	New Zealand	2020	Gill st, New Plymouth		First rainbow crossing in New Plymouth	
San Diego	United States	2020	Hillcrest neighborhood			
Auckland	New Zealand	2021	Karangahape Rd, Auckland Central		First rainbow crossing in Auckland.	
Derry	Northern Ireland	2021	Peace Bridge		First permanent rainbow crossing in the country of Northern Ireland and the island of Ireland	
Arklow	Ireland	2021	Main street		First permanent rainbow crossing in Ireland	
Gisborne	New Zealand	2021	Gladstone Road, Gisbourne		First permanent rainbow crossing in Gisbourne.	
Santa Ana	United States	2021	Highway 111 and West Buddy Rogers Avenue			
Dublin	Ireland	2022	Clondalkin		First permanent rainbow crossing in Dublin, largest city and capital of Ireland	
Cape Town	South Africa	2022	De Waterkant		First permanent rainbow crosswalk in Cape Town, and the first in South Africa. Installed in De Waterkant - the city's gay village - which hosts the start of its annual pride parade	
Manhattan Beach	United States	2021				
Long Beach	United States	2022				
Geelong	Australia	2023	Yarra Street		First intersex inclusive Progress Pride crossing in Australia, and third permanent rainbow crossing.	
Fairfax	United States	2023				
Sausalito	United States	2023				
Huntington, West Virginia	United States	2024	4th Avenue and 10th Street			
Nashville, Tennessee	United States	2024	14th and Woodland streets (East Nashville)		First rainbow crossing in Nashville and in the state of Tennessee	
Davis	United States	2025			In 2023, a rainbow crossing in Davis was painted and removed. More rainbow crossings in Davis were installed in 2025.	
Monterey	United States	2025	Alvarado Street		In 2025, Monterey's openly gay mayor Tyller Williamson supported the installation of rainbow crossings. The proposal received some criticism, but was painted at Alvarado Street in June 2025. It may face federal scrutiny.	
Sydney	Australia	2025	Taylor Square at the intersection of Bourke and Forbes streets, Darlinghurst.		Fourth permanent rainbow crossing in Australia, notable for its size and prominence in the LGBTIQA+ district of Sydney. The LGBTQIA+ museum Qtopia, is located in the round building that sits next to the Rainbow crossing.	

== See also ==
- Cuba Street rainbow crossing
- LGBTQ movements
- Stolperstein - memorials to victims of the holocaust which are laid into pavement
- Zebra crossing
