= Billboard's Open Letter on Gun Violence =

2016 petition for gun control

Billboard's Open Letter on Gun Violence, also known as Billboard's Open Letter and officially An Open Letter to Congress: Stop Gun Violence Now, was a petition for gun control organized by Billboard magazine, signed by nearly 200 prominent musical artists and entertainment industry executives, and sent to the United States Congress on June 23, 2016, for the purpose of reducing gun violence. The open letter referred to recent shooting deaths: first of singer Christina Grimmie on June 10, and then the killing of 49 people at the Pulse nightclub shooting two days later—both incidents occurring in Orlando, Florida. The petition demanded that US lawmakers enact a universal background check of every gun buyer prior to purchase, and that "suspected terrorists" be banned from buying guns. Billboard's open letter supported the House of Representatives sit-in protest led by Democratic Party members on June 22.

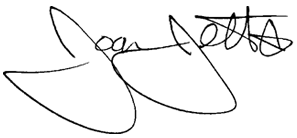
Joan Jett was the first to sign

The first artist to sign Billboard's petition was Joan Jett, followed by Lady Gaga. Other signees included Barbra Streisand, Britney Spears, Katy Perry, Billy Joel, Stevie Nicks, Alicia Keys and Sting. Ex-Beatles Paul McCartney and Ringo Starr signed, along with Yoko Ono. Grimmie's friend Selena Gomez signed the document.

Country music artist Charlie Daniels responded by opposing the open letter, saying that "bad people are bad people, and you cannot clean up anything by taking guns away." Country musicians who signed the open letter against gun violence included Rosanne Cash, Elle King, k.d. lang, Cam, the Dixie Chicks, Bonnie Raitt and Melissa Etheridge. Gun control activist Shannon Watts said that background checks on handgun sales have worked to reduce gun violence in 18 US states.

== List of signees, in published order ==
- Adam Lambert
- Adam Leber (partner, Maverick)
- Akiva Schaffer
- Alan Gilbert (conductor, New York Philharmonic)
- Alanis Morissette
- Alicia Keys
- Andrew Bird
- Andy Samberg
- Angel Coleman (musician)
- Avery Lipman
- Barbra Streisand
- Beck
- Billy Joel
- Bonnie Raitt
- Boyd Muir (CFO, Universal Music Group)
- Bradford Cobb (partner, Direct Management Group)
- Brandon Creed (artist manager)
- Brendon Urie (Panic! at the Disco)
- Britney Spears
- Butch Walker
- Calvin Harris
- Cam
- Cameron Strang (CEO, Warner Records)
- Carole King
- Charlie Puth
- Charlie Walk
- Cher
- Christina Aguilera
- Christina Perri
- Conan O'Brien
- Courtney Love
- Craig Kallman (CEO, Atlantic Records)
- Cyndi Lauper
- Dan McCarroll (president, Warner Records)
- Daniel Ek (co-founder/CEO, Spotify)
- Daniel Glass (founder, Glassnote Records
- Danny Bennett
- Dead & Company (Bill Kreutzmann, Bob Weir, Jeff Chimenti, Mickey Hart)
- Demi Lovato
- Dina LaPolt (founder, LaPolt Law)
- Diplo
- Dixie Chicks (Emily Robison, Martie Maguire, Natalie Maines)
- DJ Khaled
- Doug Morris
- Elle King
- Ellen DeGeneres
- Elvis Costello
- Eric Hutchinson
- Gregory Porter
- Halsey
- Iggy Pop
- Irving Azoff (CEO, Azoff Madison Square Entertainment)
- Jack Antonoff
- Jackson Browne
- James Corden
- James Gosnell (artist management, APA)
- Jason Kupperman (talent agent, Paradigm)
- Jason Mraz
- Jay Marciano (CEO, AEG Presents)
- Jean-Michel Jarre
- Jeffrey Harleston (Universal Music Group executive)
- Jennifer Lopez
- Jeremy Zimmer (CEO, United Talent Agency)
- Joan Jett
- Jody Gerson
- Joe Jonas
- John Esposito (CEO, Warner Music Nashville)
- John Janick
- John Mellencamp
- Josh Groban
- Julia Michaels
- Julie Greenwald (COO, Atlantic Records)
- Justin Tranter
- Kaskade
- Katy Perry
- k.d. lang
- Kelly Rowland
- Kesha
- Kevin Liles (co-founder, 300 Entertainment)
- Kid Cudi
- L.A. Reid
- Lady Gaga
- Lecrae
- Lee Daniels (CEO, Lee Daniels Entertainment)
- Linkin Park (Brad Delson, Chester Bennington, Joe Hahn, Mike Shinoda, Rob Bourdon)
- Lin-Manuel Miranda
- Los Tigres del Norte (Jorge Hernández)
- Lyor Cohen (co-founder, 300 Entertainment)
- Macklemore
- Maná (Fher Olvera)
- Marc Geiger (partner, William Morris Agency)
- Mark Pinkus (president, Rhino Entertainment)
- Mark Ronson
- Martin Bandier
- Martin Erlichman (manager, Barbra Streisand)
- Martin Kirkup (partner, Direct Management Group)
- Matisyahu
- Meghan Trainor
- Melissa Etheridge
- Michael Bublé
- Michael Rapino (CEO, Live Nation)
- Michael Stipe
- Michele Anthony
- Michelle Jubelirer
- Mike Caren (CEO, Artist Partners Group)
- Mike D
- Mike Dungan (CEO, Universal Music Group Nashville)
- Monte Lipman
- My Morning Jacket (Bo Koster, Carl Broemel, Jim James, Patrick Hallahan, Tom Blankenship)
- Nate Ruess
- Nick Jonas
- Nicky Jam
- Pasquale Rotella (CEO, Insomniac Events)
- Pat Monahan
- Paul McCartney
- Pearl Jam (Eddie Vedder, Jeff Ament, Matt Cameron, Mike McCready, Stone Gossard)
- Pete Wentz
- Peter Edge
- Peter Tork
- Phil McIntyre (CEO, Philymack)
- Prince Royce
- Pusha T
- Questlove
- Ricky Martin
- Ringo Starr
- Rivers Cuomo
- Rob Light (partner, Creative Artists Agency)
- Rob Thomas
- Roger Gold (co-founder, 300 Entertainment)
- Rosanne Cash
- Rufus Wainwright
- Russell Simmons (hip hop producer)
- Ryan Leslie (producer)
- Ryan Lewis
- Sam Gores (CEO, Paradigm Talent Agency)
- Sara Bareilles
- Scooter Braun (producer)
- Scott Borchetta (CEO, Big Machine Label Group)
- Selena Gomez
- Shakira
- Sia
- Sir Lucian Grainge
- Stephen Cooper (CEO, Warner Music Group)
- Steve Barnett
- Steve Bartels (CEO, Def Jam Recordings)
- Steve Levine (partner, ICM Partners)
- Steven Jensen (partner, Direct Management Group)
- Stevie Nicks
- Sting
- Stu Bergen (CEO, Warner Music)
- Talib Kweli
- Terence Blanchard
- The Chainsmokers (Alex Pall, Drew Taggart)
- Thom Yorke
- Tim Westergren (CEO, Pandora)
- Todd Moscowitz (co-founder, 300 Entertainment)
- Tom Corson
- Tom Windish (booking agent)
- Tony Bennett
- Tori Amos
- Trent Reznor
- Troye Sivan
- Vic Mensa
- Wayne Coyne
- Wilco (Glenn Kotche, Jeff Tweedy, John Stirratt, Mikael Jorgensen, Nels Cline, Pat Sansone)
- X Ambassadors (Adam Levin, Casey Harris, Sam Harris)
- Yoko Ono
- Zayn Malik
