= Payam-e-Afghan =

- Type: Satellite Television
- Country: United States
- Availability: Worldwide
- Headquarters: Los Angeles
- Owner: Omar Khetab
- Launch date: 1992 (radio); 2007 (TV)
- Official website: www.payameafghantv.com

Payam-E-Afghan TV is a satellite television network based in Los Angeles, California aimed at Afghan Americans and other Afghan diaspora. The channel's name derives from the Persian word payam (پیام) and translates into "Afghan message" or "Message from Afghanistan".

It launched in 2007 through a US government aid program and broadcasts news, music, and entertainment shows in primarily the Dari and Pashto languages. It is a channel owned and supported financially by Omar Khatab, who came to the US in 1978 and had worked before as a newscaster for Afghan state radio. He originally launched Payam-e-Afghan as a radio station in the early 1990s where he broadcast full time on the airwaves in northern California. The radio station broadcast call-in talk shows, news from VOA, as well as music and cooking shows.

The TV station also had multiple programs and shows from Seddique Mateen, who is the father of the perpetrator of the Orlando's Pulse nightclub shooting, Omar Mateen. His show was named “Durand Jirga”, named after Afghanistan's Durand Line border line, and he held mainly anti-Pakistan views.

In 2008, the TV station became available in Europe on Hot Bird 13°E satellite until it left in 2021. On satellite it now only broadcasts on Yahsat 1A 52.5°E which is receivable in Afghanistan itself. It also live streams on its website and has a YouTube channel.

== See also ==
- Ariana Afghanistan
