= John Esposito (disambiguation) =

John Esposito (1940–2026) was a professor of International Affairs and Islamic Studies at Georgetown University.

John Esposito may also refer to:

- John Esposito, a Bay Shore contractor sentenced in the Katie Beers kidnapping
- John Esposito (pianist) (born 1953), American jazz pianist
- John Esposito (poker player), American professional poker player
- John Esposito (music executive), American music executive
