= Abu Waheeb =

ISIL field commander (1986–2016)

- شاكر وهيب
- Waheeb in 2015
- Born: Shaker Wahib al-Fahdawi شاكر وهيب الفهداوي; 1986; Ramadi, Anbar, Iraq
- Died: May 6, 2016 (aged 29–30); Rutba, Anbar, Iraq
- Cause of death: Airstrike
- Military career
- Allegiance: Islamic State of Iraq and the Levant
- Service years: 2013–2016
- Rank: Field Commander
- Nicknames: Abu Waheeb (kunya); Lion of Anbar; Zarqawi's student Desert Lion
- Commands: ISIL Forces in Anbar Province
- Conflicts: War in Iraq (2013-17); Anbar campaign; American-led intervention in Iraq (2014–2021)

Shaker Wahib al-Fahdawi al-Dulaimi (1986 – May 6, 2016), better known as Abu Waheeb ("Father of Waheeb"; Arabic: ابو وهيب) or Abu Wahib, was an Iraqi militant jihadist who was the leader of ISIL in Anbar Province, Iraq.

He was killed with three others in a United States-led coalition airstrike in May 2016, according to the US Department of Defense. Omar Mateen, perpetrator of the Pulse nightclub shooting attributed the killing of Abu Waheeb, among other motivations, as rationale for the shooting.

== Early life and education ==
Fahdawi was born in 1986. In 2006, while studying computer science at the University of Anbar, he was arrested by US forces on charges of belonging to Al-Qaeda in Iraq.

== Arrest ==
Following his arrest, Fahdawi was detained by US forces at the Camp Bucca detention facility in southern Iraq until 2009, when he was sentenced to death and moved to Tasfirat prison located in Tikrit in the Saladin Governorate.

=== Escape ===
Fahdawi was one of 110 detainees who escaped the prison in September 2012, following an attack on the prison by forces from the Islamic State of Iraq leading to a subsequent riot and mass jailbreak within the prison. He had learnt from the senior ISI leaders he had been imprisoned with, and he became a field commander in Anbar Province after his release. Iraqi officials blamed him for a long list of terror-related offences and put a $50,000 bounty on him.

== Death ==
Fahdawi killed three Syrian Alawite truck drivers in western Iraq in the summer of 2013. By the beginning of 2014, Fahdawi was playing an important role in leading combat operations of the group, now known as the Islamic State of Iraq and the Levant, in Anbar Province during the Anbar campaign. His notoriety in Anbar was so prominent that the province was referred to as his "hunting grounds".

On May 6, 2016, the Pentagon said Abu Waheeb was killed along with three others in a vehicle by a US airstrike near Rutba.

According to transcripts, Omar Mateen, the perpetrator of the Orlando nightclub shooting, said that the attack was a response to the killing of Abu Waheeb. Mateen stated his attack was "triggered" by a May 6, 2016 U.S. bombing strike that killed Abu Waheeb. Mateen's words were: "That's what triggered it, OK? They should have not bombed and killed Abu [Waheeb]." Mateen also told a negotiator that "a lot of innocent people" were being killed and, "tell America to stop bombing Syria and Iraq".
