= Moner Mohammad Abu Salha =

American Islamist militant (1991–2014)

- Born: October 28, 1991; Palm Beach County, Florida, U.S.
- Died: May 25, 2014 (aged 22); Ariha, Idlib Governorate, Syria
- Cause of death: Suicide bombing
- Other name: Abu Hurayra al-Amriki
- Organization: Al Nusra Front
- Known for: Being the first American suicide bomber in the Syrian civil war

Moner Mohammad Abu Salha (Arabic: منير محمد أبو صالحة; also written Munir Mohammed Abou Saleha; October 28, 1991 – May 25, 2014), also known by the nom de guerre (kunya) Abu Hurayra al-Amriki (Arabic: أبو هريرة الأمريكي), was an American Islamist militant for the al-Nusra Front. At the age of 22, he became the first known American suicide bomber to die in the Syrian civil war. He produced a video describing his motivation to die on behalf of the al-Nusra Front.

== Biography ==
Abu Salha was raised in Vero Beach, Florida, as the second eldest of four children. His father was born in Jordan to Sunni Palestinian parents and operated several grocery store franchises in Central Florida. His mother, an Italian-American, was a housewife and converted to Islam after marrying her husband. The family lived in Lakes at Sandridge gated community. Abu Salha was described as a "normal boy", playing on the local basketball team during his teens. He had only been noted for a brief suspension from school after he got into a fight with fellow students who had made fun of the way Abu Salha's mother dressed.

Abu Salha dropped out of Sebastian River High School and in March 2009, he attained a GED from St. James Academy Inc. in Fort Pierce, Florida. Between 2009 and February 2012, he attended Keiser University, Indian River State College and Seminole State College of Florida. Without informing his family, Abu Salha traveled to Jordan, where he stayed with an uncle's family and worked as a nurse, before moving to Syria. He briefly returned to the United States, staying in Texas and Florida, before returning to Syria. Abu Salha joined al-Nusra Front in January 2013, saying he was inspired by sermons of Anwar al-Awlaki. His nom de guerre was derived from the historical Abu Hurayra, for Abu Salha's love of kittens, and his place of origin.

On May 25, 2014, Abu Salha drove a truck bomb filled with 16 tons of explosives into a restaurant in Ariha, killing himself and several Syrian government troops. It was one of four suicide attacks in the area that day. A total of 37 people were killed in the attacks, though the death toll from Abu Salha's bombing is unknown.

=== Connection to Omar Mateen ===
Abu Salha's name later came up as a contact in an unsuccessful 2014 investigation by the Federal Bureau of Investigation. The subject of that investigation was Omar Mateen, who would later commit the 2016 Pulse nightclub shooting. The investigation was motivated "because Abu-Salha and Mateen attended the same mosque," law-enforcement officials told The Wall Street Journal. During the shooting, Mateen told a 9-1-1 operator that the shooting was inspired by Abu Salha. In the video published by al-Nusra, Abu Salha said that he was being watched by the FBI before he left for Syria, and that he moved to stay with friends in the state of Florida in order to throw the FBI off track and make them believe he was in the United States after he had left. Both Abu Salha and Mateen lived in Fort Pierce, Florida.
