= Omar Mateen =

American mass murderer (1986–2016)

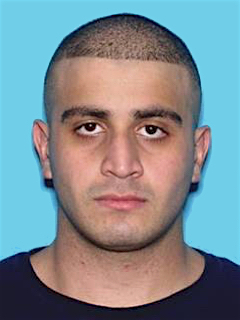
- Driver's license photo of Mateen c. 2010s
- Born: Omar Mir Seddique; November 16, 1986; New Hyde Park, New York, U.S.
- Died: June 12, 2016 (aged 29); Orlando, Florida, U.S.
- Cause of death: Gunshot wounds
- Resting place: Muslim Cemetery of South Florida, Hialeah Gardens, Florida, U.S.
- Occupation: Security guard
- Known for: Perpetrator of the Pulse nightclub shooting
- Spouses: Sitora Yusufiy (m. 2009; div. 2011) Noor Salman (m. 2011)
- Children: 1
- Allegiance: Islamic State and Abu Bakr al-Baghdadi (pledged during a call with the police)
- Motive: Revenge for killing of Abu Waheeb, frustration with American foreign policy in the Middle East, Islamic extremism, possible homophobia

Details
- Date: June 12, 2016; 10 years ago 2:02 a.m. – 5:14 a.m. EDT (UTC−04:00)
- Locations: Orlando, Florida, United States
- Target: Patrons of Pulse nightclub
- Killed: 49
- Injured: 58 (53 by gunfire)
- Weapons: Sig Sauer MCX semi-automatic rifle; Glock 17 semi-automatic pistol

Omar Mir Seddique Mateen (born Omar Mir Seddique; November 16, 1986 – June 12, 2016) was an American mass murderer and domestic terrorist who killed 49 people and wounded 58 others, 53 of them by gunfire in a mass shooting at the Pulse nightclub, a gay nightclub in Orlando, Florida, on June 12, 2016, before he was killed in a shootout with the local police. It was the deadliest mass shooting in American history until it was surpassed by the 2017 Las Vegas shooting, and it is the deadliest known incident of violence against LGBT people in U.S. history.

Born in New York to Afghan-American parents, he moved to Florida as a child, where he displayed an interest in violence and had behavioral problems in school, including struggling academically and receiving numerous suspensions. As an adult, he drifted through various jobs and a failed marriage before eventually becoming an armed G4S security guard. Before the shooting, he had been investigated for connections to terrorism by the Federal Bureau of Investigation (FBI) in 2013 and 2014. During that period, he was placed on the Terrorist Screening Database, but was subsequently removed. In a call to 911 during the shooting, Mateen identified himself as "Mujahideen", "Islamic Soldier", and "Soldier of God"; and pledged his allegiance multiple times to Abu Bakr al-Baghdadi, who at the time was the leader of the militant jihadist group, the Islamic State. He said the shooting was "triggered" by an airstrike in Iraq that killed Abu Waheeb, an IS commander, six weeks before.

== Early life ==
Mateen was born Omar Mir Seddique at Long Island Jewish Medical Center on November 16, 1986 in New Hyde Park, New York, to Afghan parents. His father, Mir Seddique Mateen, is from Herat and emigrated from Afghanistan in the 1980s and became a naturalized US citizen on November 17, 1989. Seddique Mateen was a secret informant for the FBI at times between January 2005 and June 2016. Seddique Mateen also owns a non-profit company named The Durand Jirga, Inc. based in Port St. Lucie, Florida, which was founded in 2010 where he hosted a political commentary show that aired on the California-based Payam-e-Afghan television channel, in which he expressed anti-Pakistan views. His mother, Shahla Mateen, was taken into custody after she allegedly attacked her husband while he was brushing his teeth on the night of December 7, 2002. Both of his parents first settled in New York, having four children, including Omar. After being raised in New York for a few years, he moved with his family to Port St. Lucie, Florida, in 1991. His family was described as being moderate Muslims and "all-American".

=== Behavior in school ===
At a young age, Mateen displayed a preoccupation with violence, the Associated Press and The Washington Post reported. For his elementary and middle school education, he attended classes in St. Lucie County, Florida. While at Mariposa Elementary School, a third grade teacher wrote that Mateen was "very active ... constantly moving, verbally abusive, rude, aggressive ... much talk about violence & sex ... hands all over the place – on other children, in his mouth." In the seventh grade, Mateen was moved to a separate class with the purpose of avoiding "conflicts with other students" and suffered from poor scholarly performance due to "many instances of behavioral problems."

A classmate at Mariposa said that Mateen was a bully, disrespectful to girls and acted like he was better than his classmates. Another classmate reported that Mateen was bullied at school because of his weight and his Afghan heritage. His parents were described as "dismissive" of his poor behavior while his father "had a reputation for being disrespectful of female teachers and dismissive of complaints about his son." In 1999, while Mateen was in the eighth grade, his teacher sent a letter to his father regarding an "attitude and inability to show self-control."

Mateen began his secondary education at Martin County High School in 2000, and at the age of 14 was expelled after being in a fight in math class, where he was briefly arrested without being handcuffed and charged with battery and disrupting school, though the charges were later dropped. While a sophomore attending Spectrum, an alternative high school for students with behavioral issues, classmates told The Washington Post that Mateen cheered in support of the hijackers during the September 11 attacks and stated that Osama bin Laden was his uncle who taught him how to shoot AK-47s.

After his outburst, Mateen's father arrived at the school to pick him up and slapped him in the face, with Mateen later being suspended for five days after the incident. Soon after the September 11 attacks, "he shocked other students on his school bus by imitating an exploding plane," reported The New York Times.

A retired Martin County High School dean, Dan Alley, said the school personnel "tried to counsel him and show him the error of his ways, but it never had the effect that we were hoping for" and that his father "would not back up the school, and he would always take his son's side." Mateen was later sent to St. Lucie West Centennial High School after getting into a fight with another student. By the time Mateen returned to and graduated from Martin County's Stuart Adult Vocational School in 2003, he had been suspended for 48 days for being involved in fights and injuring other students.

== Post-secondary education and employment ==
Mateen attended Indian River State College's Criminal Justice Training program and in a questionnaire, he admitted to committing or being involved in a crime that went undetected, but did not provide specific details. He went on to earn an Associate of Science degree in criminal justice technology from the college in 2006. He worked in a number of local stores and restaurants while attending school.

In October 2006, Mateen began working as a recruit for the Florida Department of Corrections, being assigned to the Martin Correctional Institution. In a letter explaining his juvenile record as part of his successful application, Mateen explained the incident of when he was arrested at school when he was fourteen. He also wrote that he had experimented with marijuana as a young teenager. Following the Virginia Tech shooting in April 2007, Mateen suggested in a corrections officer training class that he would bring a gun to class. P.H. Skipper, who was the warden at the institution, wrote that "in light of the tragic events at Virginia Tech officer Mateen's inquiry about bringing a weapon to class is at best extremely disturbing." Days later on April 27, 2007, Mateen "was involuntarily dismissed" from the program and never became a certified corrections officer.

Mateen then worked for British-based security firm G4S Secure Solutions in Jupiter, Florida, from September 2007 until his death. In 2010, Mateen, while working for G4S, was interviewed for and appears in The Big Fix, the 2012 documentary about the Deepwater Horizon oil spill. Mateen said of those working on the cleanup: "Nobody gives a shit here. Everybody's just, get out to get paid. They're like hoping for more oil to come out and more people to complain so they'll have jobs. They want more disaster to happen."

=== Screening issues ===
G4S said two screenings of Mateen—one conducted upon hiring and the other in 2013—had raised no red flags. Under Florida state law, for him to work as an armed guard the company was required either to make a full psychiatric evaluation of Mateen, or to administer a "validated written psychological test." The test administered was the updated Minnesota Multiphasic Personality Inventory (MMPI-2), a test used for job screenings and court cases requiring those subjected to it to agree or disagree with statements such as "My soul sometimes leaves my body" and "Once in a while I think of things too bad to talk about." Carol Nudelman, the psychologist listed on the character certification submitted by G4S to the state, said she stopped working for the company in 2005. After the shooting, Nudelman, who according to the records of the security company G4S, was said to have evaluated and cleared Mateen for his firearms license in 2007, denied ever meeting him or living in Florida at the time, and said she had stopped her practice in Florida in January 2006. G4S said Mateen was not actually interviewed by a psychologist, but rather a psychologist evaluated the results of a standard test used in job screenings and his test was evaluated by the firm that bought Nudelman's practice, Headquarters for Psychological Evaluation.

On September 10, 2016, the Florida Department of Agriculture and Consumer Services fined G4S $151,400 for providing inaccurate psychological testing information after it found the psychologist whose opinion was necessary to permit Mateen to carry a weapon was not practicing as a screener. Between 2006 and 2016, 1,514 forms were submitted erroneously listing Nudelman's name. Mateen's form was among those investigated. He had taken the MMPI-2 and Dr. Syed Shafeeq Rahman, a family physician who had close ties with Mateen's family, gave him a medical clearance. Rahman was also the imam of the Fort Pierce mosque to which the family belonged and said that Mateen had become progressively more "reclusive," and did not speak to other congregants before or after services. G4S admitted Mateen's form had a "clerical error," and clarified that he had instead been cleared by Rahman, who was from the same firm that bought the wrongly named doctor's practice. Rahman had not interviewed Mateen, but evaluated the results of a standard test used in the screening he undertook before being hired. Nonetheless, G4S removed Mateen from his job post at a courthouse because of threats he made towards coworkers, including one threat where he claimed he would have al-Qaeda kill a deputy's family. Mateen had claimed that his coworkers and courthouse deputies were making racist comments towards him. Despite this, G4S "kept Mateen as an employee" but moved him "to a kiosk at a gated community in Palm Beach County." They never informed the community or its property management company about why he was transferred there.

Mateen held an active concealed carry permit and an armed security guard license. It was also noted that Mateen had no adult criminal record. According to licensing records, he was a proficient shooter who scored at or above the 98th percentile with a 9mm semiautomatic pistol.

== Personal life ==
In 2006, Mateen filed a petition for a name change, adding Mateen as his surname to match that of his parents.

In April 2009, Mateen married his first wife, Sitora Alisherzoda Yusufiy, an Uzbekistan-born woman whom he met in 2008 through Myspace, a social networking site. They separated after four months and divorced in July 2011.

Mateen visited Saudi Arabia for an eight-day trip in March 2011 and a ten-day trip in March 2012. The latter was organized by the Islamic Center at New York University. It included twelve New York City police officers and groups from Columbia and Yale and visited Mecca and Medina. Around this time, he went to the United Arab Emirates. FBI Director James Comey said Saudi officials helped investigate Mateen's trips. In June 2016, the House Intelligence Committee said that U.S. investigators "are searching for details about the Saudi Arabia trips."

In 2011, Mateen met his second wife, Noor Zahi Salman, on an online dating site. The two married shortly afterward in Hercules, California on September 29, 2011. She moved into Mateen's Fort Pierce home in November 2012. By September 2013, they were living in a house in Port St. Lucie with Mateen's father and another relative. She reportedly left Mateen and joined relatives in Rodeo, California by December 2015. At the time of his death, Mateen had a three-year-old son with Salman.

At the time of the shooting, he lived about 100 miles (160 km) from Orlando, Florida, in Fort Pierce, but received mail at his parents' home in nearby Port St. Lucie. According to Florida Department of Law Enforcement records, he had no criminal record in Florida.

Seddique Mateen, the father of Omar Mateen, attended a public campaign rally for Hillary Clinton in Kissimmee, Florida, on August 8, 2016.

=== Characterization ===
Mateen's father, Mir Seddique Mateen, said of his son's actions, "This had nothing to do with religion." He was quoted as saying that he had seen his son get angry after witnessing a gay couple kiss in front of his family at the Bayside Marketplace in Miami months before the attack, which he suggested might have been a motivating factor. The elder Mateen had formerly hosted a political TV show called Durand Jirga Show on California-based satellite television network Payam-e-Afghan in 2015, in which he denounced the then-Afghan President Ashraf Ghani, denounced the Pakistani government, self-represented himself as a candidate for the President of Afghanistan, and had expressed gratitude towards the Taliban. In one video of his show, the elder Mateen seems to call on the Afghan Taliban, which he called "our warrior brothers", to solve the issue of the disputed Durand Line, which marks the present international border between Afghanistan and Pakistan.

Following the nightclub attack, Mateen's ex-wife told media outlets that during their marriage, Mateen was mentally unstable, and would beat her and keep her completely separated from her family. She also said that he was bipolar, though he had never been given that diagnosis, and had a history of using steroids. Mateen's second wife also said that Mateen became physically and verbally abusive towards her six months into their marriage, though she noted him being kinder in the weeks leading up to the shooting. A former high school student told The Washington Post that he witnessed 14-year-old Mateen, on the day of the September 11, 2001, attacks, being physically assaulted by his father, Mir Seddique Mateen, in front of other students.

Imam Shafiq Rahman at the Fort Pierce Islamic Center told reporters that Mateen would come to the mosque "three or four times a week" with his father and his three-year-old son as recently as two days before the shooting, and said, "He was the most quiet guy. He would come and pray and leave. There was no indication at all of violence." Rahman added that he did not preach violence toward homosexuals.

A former high school friend and coworker said that Mateen had no obvious conflicts with his gay coworkers at Treasure Coast Square, a shopping mall at Jensen Beach.

A former coworker who worked with Mateen in a gated community in western Port St. Lucie described him as "unhinged and unstable." He also said that he frequently made homophobic, racist, and sexist comments, and talked about killing people. The coworker stated he complained to G4S about Mateen "several times"; another co-worker told The New York Times Mateen made people wait at the gate for a number of reasons, including "if it was time for him to do his prayers." A resident who had lived at the community since 2011 described Mateen as "very polite" and "a very nice, positive person"; however, another customer said Mateen "acted like a straight-up predator."

=== Sexual orientation ===
Several people who knew Mateen have speculated that he might have been gay or bisexual. A male friend of his from 2006, when the two were in police academy together, said that Mateen went to gay clubs with him and that Mateen once expressed an interest in dating him. Club-goers also recalled Mateen dancing with another man. One classmate, who asked not to be identified by name, said Mateen asked him if he was gay. The FBI has investigated many of these claims but has not found reasonable evidence to establish Mateen's sexual orientation.

After the shooting, the Orlando Sentinel and The Palm Beach Post reported that at least five regular customers at the Pulse nightclub had seen Mateen visit the venue on at least a dozen occasions. Sometimes Mateen drank in a corner by himself "and other times he would get so drunk he was loud and belligerent." A witness, who recognized Mateen outside the club an hour before the shootings, told investigators that Mateen had been messaging him for about a year using a gay dating app called Jack'd. He gave his phone to the FBI for analysis, along with his login details for the application. A third witness said that Mateen had tried to pick up men at the nightclub. Dozens of other witnesses, however, told the Tampa Bay Times that they had never seen Mateen at the nightclub. A spokesperson for Barbara Poma, the owner of the Pulse nightclub, called the statement that Mateen had been a regular patron "untrue and totally ridiculous."

Mateen's father Seddique denied that his son was closeted, saying, "If he was gay, why would he do something like this?" Two days later, after multiple reports questioned whether Mateen was homosexual, Mateen's father said, "I didn't see any of it and I don't believe that was the case." However, during an interview with the Brazilian television station SBT Brazil, Mateen's ex-wife claimed that his father called him gay while in her presence. Following the shooting, Mateen's father stated, in an online video in his native language, "In this month of Ramadan, the gay and lesbian issue is something that God will punish," though "the servants of God shouldn't have anything to do with it."

The Wall Street Journal reported Mateen's ex-wife as saying that "[he] did feel strongly about homosexuality." When asked if Mateen was gay, his ex-wife said she "didn't know" and recalled that he had confessed to going to nightclubs.

==== Investigation into claims ====
On June 16, The New York Times reported that the FBI was skeptical of reports that Mateen was "gay but 'closeted'" and that he had made use of homosexual bars and apps. On June 18, the same source added that "federal officials say they have found no evidence in his effects or online presence to back them up." On June 23, the Los Angeles Times reported that the FBI had found no evidence "to support claims by those who say Mateen had gay lovers or communicated on gay dating apps."

Investigators considered at least one claimant of homosexual relationships with Mateen as not "credible." "Miguel," a man who self-identified as Mateen's lover-of-two-months, had said that he believed the massacre was committed in revenge against Latino men, following Mateen's learning that he might have been exposed to HIV from a Puerto Rican man with whom he had sex. Nevertheless, Mateen's autopsy results confirmed that he was HIV-negative.

On June 25, The New York Times reported that after exhaustive investigation with help from the FBI, the gay dating network Adam4Adam concluded that Mateen had never used its app. With regard to reports of Mateen using it and other dating sites and apps for gay men, an Adam4Adam spokesman said, "I think it was a hoax." The article stated that after 500 interviews, the FBI had not found any evidence of homosexuality "through (Mateen's) web searches, emails or other electronic data." The FBI reported that they had "found evidence that Mateen was cheating on his wife with other women."

== Alleged links to terrorist groups ==
The FBI investigated Mateen in May 2013 after he made "inflammatory" remarks while working as a security guard. Mateen had told his coworkers that his family was linked to al-Qaeda and that he had joined Hezbollah, both rivals of the Islamic State (IS) and of one another. Mateen pledged allegiance to IS during his 2016 shooting. FBI Director James Comey commented on the contradictions within Mateen's statements. The FBI interviewed Mateen twice after opening the investigation; in these interviews, Mateen admitted to making the statements but "explained that he said them in anger because his co-workers were teasing him." After ten months, the investigation was closed and Mateen determined not to be a threat. Mateen had been placed on a terrorist watch list while the investigation was under way, but he was removed from it afterwards. Mateen came to the FBI's attention again in July 2014, when he was linked to Moner Mohammad Abu Salha, an American who had traveled to Syria and committed a suicide bombing in late May 2014. The two had been acquainted and "attended the same mosque." The investigation continued, but focused on Abu Salha rather than Mateen, law-enforcement officials told The Wall Street Journal.

U.S. Representative Adam Schiff, the ranking Democratic member of the House Intelligence Committee, said that according to the Department of Homeland Security, Mateen had pledged allegiance to IS, though analysts noted that "at this point, it's anyone's guess as to how involved Omar Mateen was with either Al Qaeda or IS." Mateen had also pledged support for a suicide bomber who claimed to represent the al-Nusra Front, a Syrian branch of al-Qaeda and an opponent of IS. After Mateen's attack, the FBI determined his computer had been used to watch extremist videos, including beheadings, and "to seek information on Islamic State." His wife knew he watched the jihadist videos, "but she did not think much of it because the F.B.I. seemed to have cleared him." A survivor of the shooting said Mateen talked about wanting the United States to "stop bombing my country" and confirmed that Mateen pledged allegiance to IS.

== Pulse nightclub shooting ==
=== Before the shooting ===
Two months before the attack, Mateen transferred his share of a Port St. Lucie home for only $10 to his sister and brother-in-law.

Mateen legally purchased a SIG Sauer SIG MCX semi-automatic rifle and a 9mm Glock 17 handgun, the two firearms later used in the shooting, from a gun shop in Port St. Lucie two weeks before the shooting. He also attempted to purchase body armor, but was unable to do so as the store where he tried to make the purchase did not sell the product he sought. Several weeks before the attack, he attempted to purchase body armor and 1,000 rounds of bulk ammunition at another gun shop, but the staff became suspicious of him and turned him away. A salesperson at the shop then said he contacted the FBI, but federal officials said they had no record of such a report, and the local sheriff's office also said it was unaware of the incident.

ABC News and Fox News reported that early in the morning of June 12, the day of the attack, Mateen posted on one of his Facebook accounts: "The real muslims will never accept the filthy ways of the west ... You kill innocent women and children by doing us airstrikes...now taste the Islamic state [sic] vengeance" as well as "America and Russia stop bombing the Islamic state." His final post to Facebook was "In the next few days you will see attacks from the Islamic State in the usa." These posts, since deleted, were uncovered by the United States Senate Committee on Homeland Security and Governmental Affairs.

=== Wife's alleged role and acquittal ===
Officials briefed on the investigation also said Mateen went to an unspecified Walt Disney World theme park with his wife. He visited both Disney Springs, where security is less strict than at Disney theme parks, and Pulse between June 1 and 6 during the Gay Days 2016 celebrations at Disney World and in the Orlando area.

An imam for a mosque in Kissimmee said Mateen prayed there with his wife and child during the week preceding the shooting. He released video footage showing what appeared to be Mateen on June 8, four days before the shooting, praying for about ten minutes.

Hours before the attack, Mateen stopped by his parents' home to visit his father, who said he did not notice anything strange about his son during the visit. That same day, Omar gave his second wife, Noor Salman, $1,000 and allowed her to depart to visit her mother in California.

On June 14, 2016, NBC News reported that Noor Salman told the FBI she "drove him once to the gay nightclub, Pulse, because he wanted to scope it out." The FBI was almost immediately aware that this was not true, due to its review of cell phone location records from the day in question. Omar Mateen had searched for Orlando nightclub locations in the evening before the attack.

An official involved with the investigation told the Associated Press that authorities believed she knew about the plot beforehand, but were reluctant to charge her based only on this suspicion. Days before the shooting, she had accompanied Mateen on a shopping trip where he purchased ammunition while she was elsewhere buying a child's toy. She warned him the evening before the event against anything that he might be planning.

On March 30, 2018, an Orlando jury found her not guilty as the prosecution had not met its burden of providing evidentiary proof. According to the jury foreman, the jury felt she had vague foreknowledge of her husband's intentions. The FBI agent's interrogation went untaped, meaning the jurors did not get to see or hear it. She had been held in jail awaiting trial since her arrest in California five months after the massacre.

=== Shooting and death ===
At approximately 2:02 a.m. on June 12, 2016, Mateen entered the Pulse nightclub in Orlando, Florida, and began shooting. At 2:22 a.m., he made a 911 call in which he pledged allegiance to IS, referenced Tamerlan and Dzhokhar Tsarnaev, the Boston Marathon bombers, and mentioned Moner Mohammad Abu Salha, an acquaintance of his who died in a suicide bombing in Syria for the Al-Nusra Front in 2014. According to FBI officials, Mateen made two other 911 calls during the shooting. He also called News 13 of Orlando and identified himself as the nightclub shooter; The Washington Post reported that he said "he had carried out the Pulse attack for the Islamic State." The Islamic State had also released a statement via Amaq News Agency, taking responsibility for the attack.

Around 4 a.m., Mateen threatened the police that he would blow up and collapse the entire building using explosive vests, fitted to the hostages and placed in different strategic corners of the building so that everything would collapse. Mateen took hostages after police arrived and engaged in a gunfight with him. At approximately 5:14 a.m. police shot and killed Mateen, ending the shooting. A total of 49 people were left dead along with Mateen, and 53 others were injured. Mateen was reported to have fired at least 110 rounds during the entire event. The attack was the deadliest known incident of violence against LGBT people in U.S. history (Note: The previous deadliest incident of violence against LGBT people had been the UpStairs Lounge arson attack in 1973, in which 32 victims were killed.) and the deadliest mass shooting by a single gunman in the United States until the 2017 Las Vegas shooting. (Note: The previous deadliest shooting had been the Virginia Tech shooting in 2007, in which 32 victims were killed.)

An autopsy found he was shot eight times by police in the head, chest, abdomen, calf, feet, and toe. The bullets, fired from a short distance, went through from front to back, suggesting he was shot while facing officers. Several lacerations and "blunt-force injuries," such as bruising and scrapes to his torso, were found, although the origin of these wounds was unclear. No alcohol or illegal drugs were detected in his system. He was wearing two pairs of socks. Mateen was eventually buried in the Muslim Cemetery of South Florida, in Hialeah Gardens.

== See also ==
- List of Islamist terrorist attacks
- List of rampage killers (religious, political, or ethnic crimes)
- Terrorism in the United States
- Violence against LGBT people
