= 2016 United States House of Representatives sit-in =

Sit-in protest at United States Capitol

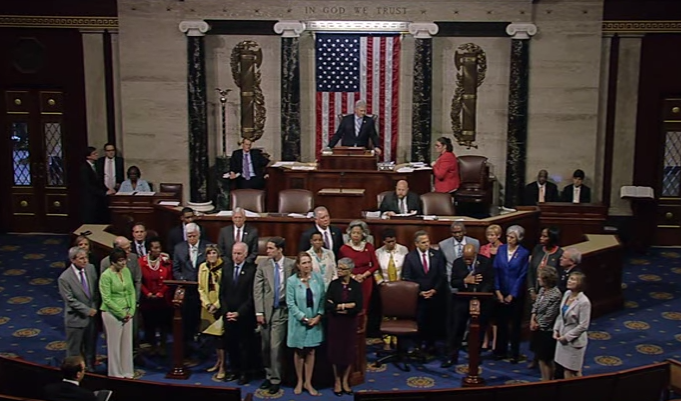
- House Democrats begin the sit-in
- Date: June 22–23, 2016
- Location: United States Capitol
- Type: Protest
- Cause: Pulse nightclub shooting
- Motive: Gun control legislation

The 2016 United States House of Representatives sit-in began on June 22, 2016, when members of the House Democratic Caucus, led by Georgia Representative John Lewis, Massachusetts Representative Katherine Clark, and Illinois Representative Robin Kelly, declared their intention to remain on the floor of the United States House of Representatives until its Republican Speaker, Paul Ryan, allowed votes on gun control legislation in the aftermath of the June 12 Orlando nightclub shooting. The sit-in was staged by about 60 legislators. (Note: The legislators included Katherine Clark, John Yarmuth, Chris Murphy, Richard Blumenthal, Dick Durbin, Al Franken, Amy Klobuchar, Patty Murray, Ed Markey, Bill Nelson, Claire McCaskill, Chellie Pingree, Mazie Hirono, Ben Cardin, Patrick Leahy, Chris Coons, Cory Booker, Diana DeGette, Chuck Schumer and Joe Courtney.) Barack Obama, Bill Clinton, and Hillary Clinton showed their support via Twitter.

The sit-in, which was quickly organized and caught House Republicans off-guard, resulted in the Speaker pro tempore, Dan Webster, ordering the House into recess, with the cameras which provide video coverage of the chamber's daily proceedings to news networks including C-SPAN consequently shut off. Democrats refused to leave the floor during this recess and instead gave speeches, streamed online to over a million individuals via Periscope and Facebook, demanding Congressional action to combat gun violence.

The House was reconvened by Ryan later on June 22 at 10:00 p.m. to consider a presidential veto message, and again at 2:30 a.m. on June 23 to vote on a bill to fund the Department of Veterans Affairs, military construction, and the country's response to the outbreak of the Zika virus, both times to chaotic scenes in the chamber. The House was then adjourned until July 5, without having taken action on any of the measures demanded by Democrats. Despite this, many Democrats insisted they would remain on the floor regardless, with California congresswoman Maxine Waters saying she would remain in place "until hell freezes over".

A group of Democrats ultimately occupied the floor through the night, only leaving on the afternoon of June 23, with Lewis as the last speaker before the sit-in's conclusion. None of the measures demanded by the occupying members were given a vote, but Democrats insisted that they would continue to pursue gun control legislation.

== Planning ==
House Democrats had long sought to bring gun control legislation to the floor of the House, and this desire was reinvigorated in the aftermath of the Orlando nightclub shooting, which had left 49 dead. The use of a discharge petition to force a vote was being considered by the chamber's Democratic leadership, but was not pursued due to the lengthy process involved, and a doubt that it would be able to obtain the requisite majority of 218 signatures from members of the House.

On June 19, Democratic leader Nancy Pelosi asked outgoing congressman Steve Israel to provide her with an alternative list of ways in which Democrats could force the issue in the House. Incidentally, the next day, on June 20, four gun control measures failed to pass in the United States Senate.

This resulted in a June 21 attempt by Assistant Democratic Leader Jim Clyburn to force action through a motion to recommit, and the adoption of a "No Bill, No Break" mantra, which was soon shouted by Democratic members on the floor of the House, and became a popular hashtag on Twitter. Concurrent to the leadership's efforts, a group of "12 to 15" Democratic backbenchers, led by Massachusetts congresswoman Katherine Clark, and with significant assistance from Connecticut's John Larson, convened in Clark's office on the night of June 21, with the goal of ensuring the House "couldn't proceed" until a vote was held. The plot was soon uncovered by party leadership, which endorsed their plan in principle, but advised the plotters to "go big" and to select a significant figure as the face of their activity.

Clark and Larson then asked Georgia congressman John Lewis, the Democrats' longtime Senior Chief Deputy Whip and a veteran of many sit-ins during the Civil Rights Movement, to act as their leader. Lewis accepted, and hosted a final meeting with the plotters in his office late on June 21.

The plot was revealed to the remainder of the Democratic Caucus by Pelosi at a meeting on the morning of June 22, just prior to a long-planned appearance by the party's presumptive presidential nominee, Hillary Clinton. While Clinton spoke, Larson slipped off to the office of the House Parliamentarian, and vaguely asked what would happen if members were to stage a sit-in on the floor of the House; he was told such action would be "unprecedented" and its ramifications impossible to predict.

== Sitting ==
=== June 22: Sit-in begins ===
The Democrats claim the floor and begin their sit-in

The sit-in began just after the House convened on the morning of June 22. After speeches in support of gun control legislation by Clark, Earl Blumenauer, David Cicilline, Rosa DeLauro, Chellie Pingree, Mike Capuano, Donna Edwards, Stacey Plaskett, and Jan Schakowsky, Lewis was recognized to speak by Republican congressman Dan Webster, who was temporarily occupying the chair; Lewis then asked fellow Democratic members to join him in the well of the House, and demanded a vote "today". The chair then recognized Larson, who echoed this call, before returning the floor to Lewis, who said Democrats would "occupy the floor until there is action".

The session was almost immediately gaveled to a conclusion by Webster, and the chamber's cameras, which are controlled at the discretion of the majority party, were immediately shut off. Democrats, who continued to speak from the well of the House, responded by live-streaming their sit-in on Periscope and Facebook Live; these streams, which were a violation of House rules, were soon picked up by C-SPAN and other cable news networks, who lacked access to the House's official cameras during a recess.

==== Attempts to reclaim the House ====
Poe's failed attempt to reclaim order

Republicans first attempted to reclaim control of House proceedings at noon on June 22, sending Texas congressman Ted Poe (R-Texas) to act as Speaker pro tempore of the House. Following the chaplain's prayer and the Pledge of Allegiance, the protesting Representatives refused to come to order and Poe was easily drowned out, so he again recessed the House without any legislative action having been taken.

Senate Democrats were quick to support their House colleagues, with many senators taking a seat on the House floor alongside them. Numerous Democratic senators were also quick to provide House Democrats with care packages filled with food and candy, and to arrange pizza and Chinese food deliveries to the House Democratic cloakroom. Meanwhile, many House Democrats dispatched staffers to obtain sleeping bags and pillows, expecting to remain on the House floor throughout the night; such gestures are commonly seen in the upper chamber during a filibuster, but are practically unheard of in the House.

The sit-in caught House Republicans, and the Speaker, Paul Ryan, largely off-guard. During the afternoon of June 22, Ryan said the Democrats' actions constituted a "publicity stunt", and that he would refuse to bind future Speakers to precedent by allowing a vote on any of the demanded measures. Despite this, Ryan declined to direct the Sergeant-at-Arms to clear the floor.

Just after 10:00 p.m. on June 22, nearly 11 hours after Democrats seized control of the floor, Ryan took his position at the House rostrum and reconvened the chamber. He attempted to regain control of the House, calling for decorum and conduct that respects the Institution of the House from his fellow representatives. However, Ryan was drowned out by boos and chants of "No Bill, No Break" from assembled Democrats (many of whom were holding aloft signs with pictures and the names of gun violence victims), and to rare heckling from the public gallery. Ryan quickly ordered a vote to override a presidential veto; House Democrats successfully prevented this attempt, but sought to slow down the process by voting with paper cards, rather than electronically as is common, and by forcing Republicans to push through a crowd to reach electronic voting sites. As Ryan descended from the rostrum after calling the 15-minute vote, he was met by chants of "shame" from Democratic members, and quickly retreated to a cluster of Republicans. The Democrats, meanwhile, persisted in shouting and singing their demands for gun control legislation, as well as calling out the names of recent victims of gun deaths. They also demanded a vote on gun measures be held before the Fourth of July, when a week-long congressional recess is scheduled. Democrats sang "We Shall Overcome" in unison as the result of the vote was read, and the chamber was again gaveled into recess.

After the House went into recess a third time, Democrats again began to speak from the well of the House. A few minutes into a presentation by California congressman Brad Sherman, Texas Republican Louie Gohmert angrily approached the assembled Democrats, and began a shouting match with Corrine Brown of Florida. Gohmert, shouting that the attack had been caused by "radical Islam" and that guns were a non-issue, had to be restrained by fellow Republican members, and the Sergeant-at-Arms began to patrol the floor. Don Young, a long-serving Republican from Alaska, also sought to confront Democrats on the House floor, and had to be restrained by Republican members and staff.

=== June 23: Sit-in ends ===
Meanwhile, hundreds of protesters in support of the Democratic sit-in began to assemble outside of the Capitol. The protesters, who echoed many of the chants delivered by Democrats on the House floor, were addressed through the night of June 22 by the plotters, and by House Democratic leader Nancy Pelosi, who told reporters "we are in for the long haul here" and that the sit-in would continue.

At 2:30 a.m. on June 23, the House again convened with another measure, this time to fund the Department of Veterans Affairs, military construction, and the country's response to the Zika virus, similarly brought to a vote. After the conclusion of this vote, Republicans quickly forced through a motion to adjourn the House until July 5. Despite this, Democrats remained on the floor, insisting they would remain there throughout the rest of the day.

Democrats ultimately remained on the floor through the night, with "about a dozen" remaining present and taking turns at the lectern until early the next morning. The House Democratic Whips' office requested the presence of its members on the morning of June 23, which succeeded in nearly doubling the total in attendance. The sit-in concluded at midday on June 23, with Lewis as the last speaker before the floor was vacated. At the sit-in's conclusion, the protesting members had been unable to force a vote on any of their demanded measures; despite this, Lewis defined their actions as a "struggle", which "we are going to win".

== Reaction ==
=== Outside Democrats ===
President Barack Obama tweeted support for Lewis and House Democrats, saying they were "leading on gun violence where we need it most".

Former President Bill Clinton, the husband of then-presumptive Democratic presidential nominee Hillary Clinton, tweeted in support, "This is leadership." Hillary also tweeted her support.

=== House Republicans ===
Speaker Ryan decried the sit-in as a "publicity stunt", and called for legislative action to be taken through regular order, rather than as a result of a sit-in. He questioned its correlation with Democratic fundraising efforts, and noted bills with similar aims had already been defeated through bipartisan voting earlier in the week, contrasting that "regular order" with a "very dangerous precedent" for "chaos".

Mark Walker, a North Carolina congressman, said "calling this a sit-in is a disgrace to Woolworth's", questioning whether gun legislation could be compared to the civil rights movement.

=== Billboard magazine and musicians ===
On June 23, Billboard magazine published an open letter addressed to the United States Congress demanding that universal background checks become federal law. The petition carried nearly 200 signatures of famous musicians and music industry executives. Joan Jett, Lady Gaga, Selena Gomez and many others were prominent signees of the document. The timing of the petition was said by Vanity Fair magazine to be "a show of solidarity" in favor of the House Democrats.

== Aftermath ==
On January 3, 2017, the House convened the 115th Congress and passed rules intended to prevent future sit-ins. The new rules included language against disorderly or disruptive conduct, in addition to bans against members of Congress taking pictures and video on the House floor, though an exemption for the latter occurs for events such as the State of the Union addresses. Fines are also included within the new rules, with $500 being mandated for first offenses and $2,500 for each additional offense.

== See also ==
- Chris Murphy gun control filibuster
- Gun control after the Sandy Hook Elementary School shooting
- Gun politics in the United States
- Orlando nightclub shooting
- Reactions to the 2016 Orlando nightclub shooting
