= John Esposito (music executive) =

American music executive

- Born: Punxsutawney, Pennsylvania
- Other name: "Espo"
- Education: Indiana University of Pennsylvania (BA)
- Occupation: Music executive
- Known for: Chairman/CEO of Warner Music Nashville

Signature
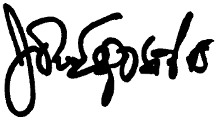

John Esposito is an American music executive who is the current chairman and CEO of Warner Music Nashville, a country music label group. In that role, he has overseen the careers of Blake Shelton, Dan + Shay, Brett Eldredge, Gabby Barrett, and numerous others.

== Early life and education ==
John Esposito was born in Punxsutawney, Pennsylvania. When he was 11, Esposito's family moved to nearby Indiana, Pennsylvania. He graduated from Indiana Area Senior High School where he played drums in various school bands. Esposito later attended Indiana University of Pennsylvania where he graduated in 1978 with a bachelor's degree in journalism. While at the school, he also served as a DJ for the university's radio station (WIUP), as a music critic for its newspaper, and as a drummer, guitarist, and vocalist in several bands including Cimarron, the Joe Bagadonuts Band, and Crystal.

== Career ==
After graduating from college, Esposito moved to Washington, D.C. to pursue a career in journalism. Instead, he found a job as a clerk at a record store called Harmony Hut. He quickly worked his way up to manager, and in a few years, he was managing multiple record stores on the East Coast. This ultimately led to a position as a buyer in the Macy's TV department and eventually a role with the sales and operation staff at Mitsubishi. Esposito worked at Mitsubishi from 1986 to 1993, attaining the title of regional vice president of the northeast division. In 1993, he took a position as the COO of music and movies at The Wiz, an electronics retail chain.

His experience there led him to a job with PolyGram, where he held various executive roles (including senior vice president of PolyMedia) until 1997. In 1998, he became the founding general manager and executive vice president at The Island Def Jam Music Group. In that role, he oversaw acts like Jay-Z, DMX, Bon Jovi, and Ja Rule. In October 2002, he was named the president of WEA, Corp.—the sales and marketing arm of the Warner Music Group. In that role, he also oversaw the Independent Label Group and the Alternative Distribution Alliance. He was later promoted to president and CEO of WEA, Corp.

In September 2009, he was named the first president and CEO of the newly formed Warner Music Nashville (WMN), a label group for Warner's country music acts and imprints (Atlantic Nashville, Warner Bros. Nashville, Elektra Nashville, and Loudmouth Records). At the time, Blake Shelton was considered to be the label group's "only serious hitmaker". Within five years, however, Esposito had helped increase WMN's market share from 3.4% to 8.6%. He was also credited with jump starting the careers of Shelton, Hunter Hayes, Brett Eldredge, and Cole Swindell during that time. In January 2015, Esposito was named the president of the Country Music Association (CMA) and was named chairman of the CMA board later that year.

In 2016, Esposito was promoted to chairman and CEO of Warner Music Nashville. That year, Blake Shelton broke a record for WMN with 17 consecutive number-one singles on the Billboard Country Airplay chart. In 2017, Esposito was honored with the Innovator of the Year Award at the Innovation in Music Awards (IMAs). In 2018, he signed artist Kenny Chesney to WMN. The label saw a 20% rise in market share that year partially due to the success of Dan + Shay's self-titled album. In 2019, Esposito signed Gabby Barrett whose first single, "I Hope," was eventually certified quadruple platinum. In November 2019, Esposito extended his contract to remain chairman and CEO of WMN for several more years. That month, the WMN acts Blake Shelton, Ashley McBryde, and Dan + Shay were nominated for Grammy Awards, with the latter act winning for Best Country Duo/Group Performance. Over the course of his time at WMN, Esposito has routinely appeared on the Billboard Power 100 list, including most recently in 2020.
