= London =

Capital of England and the United Kingdom

- Capital city
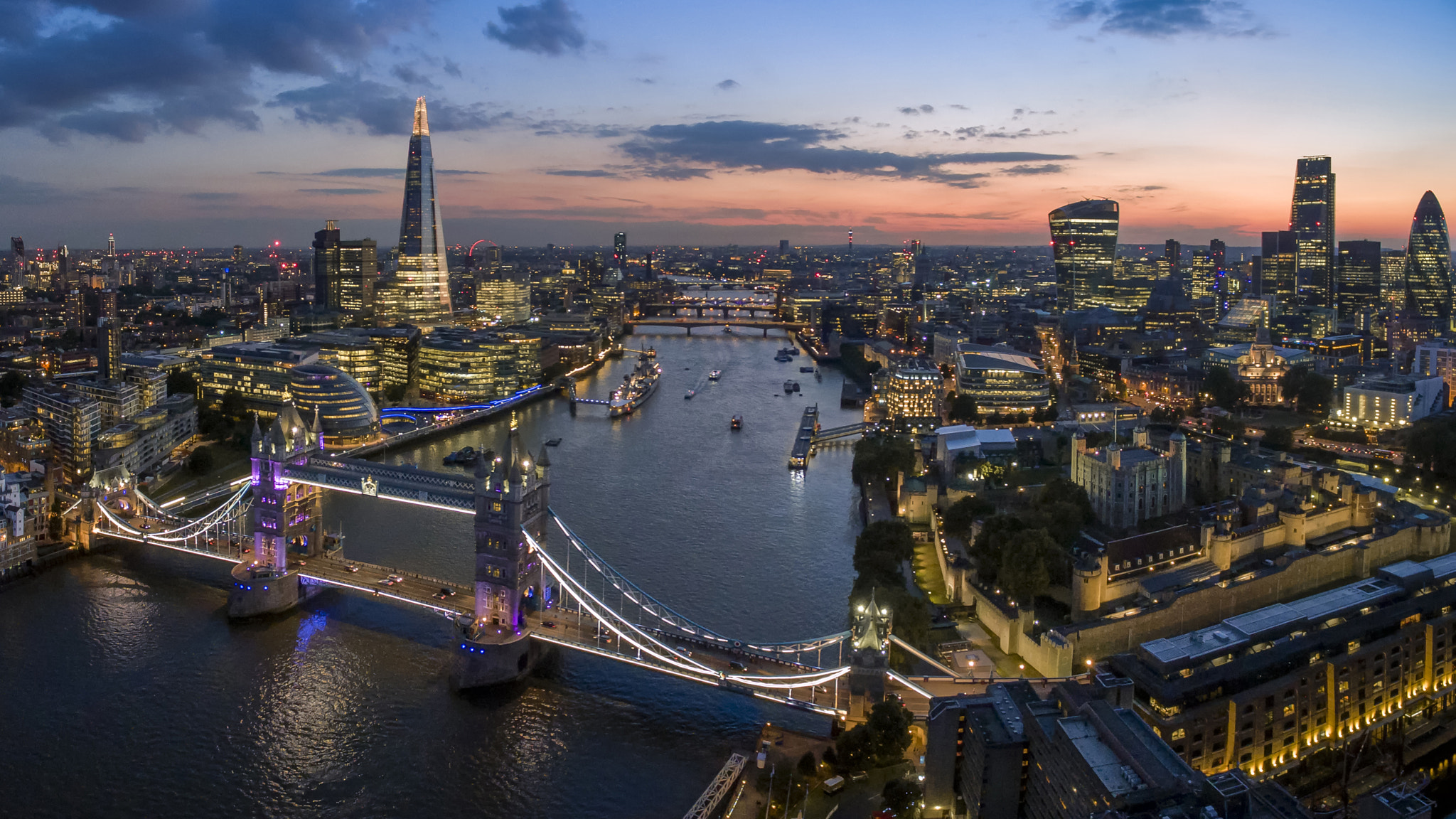
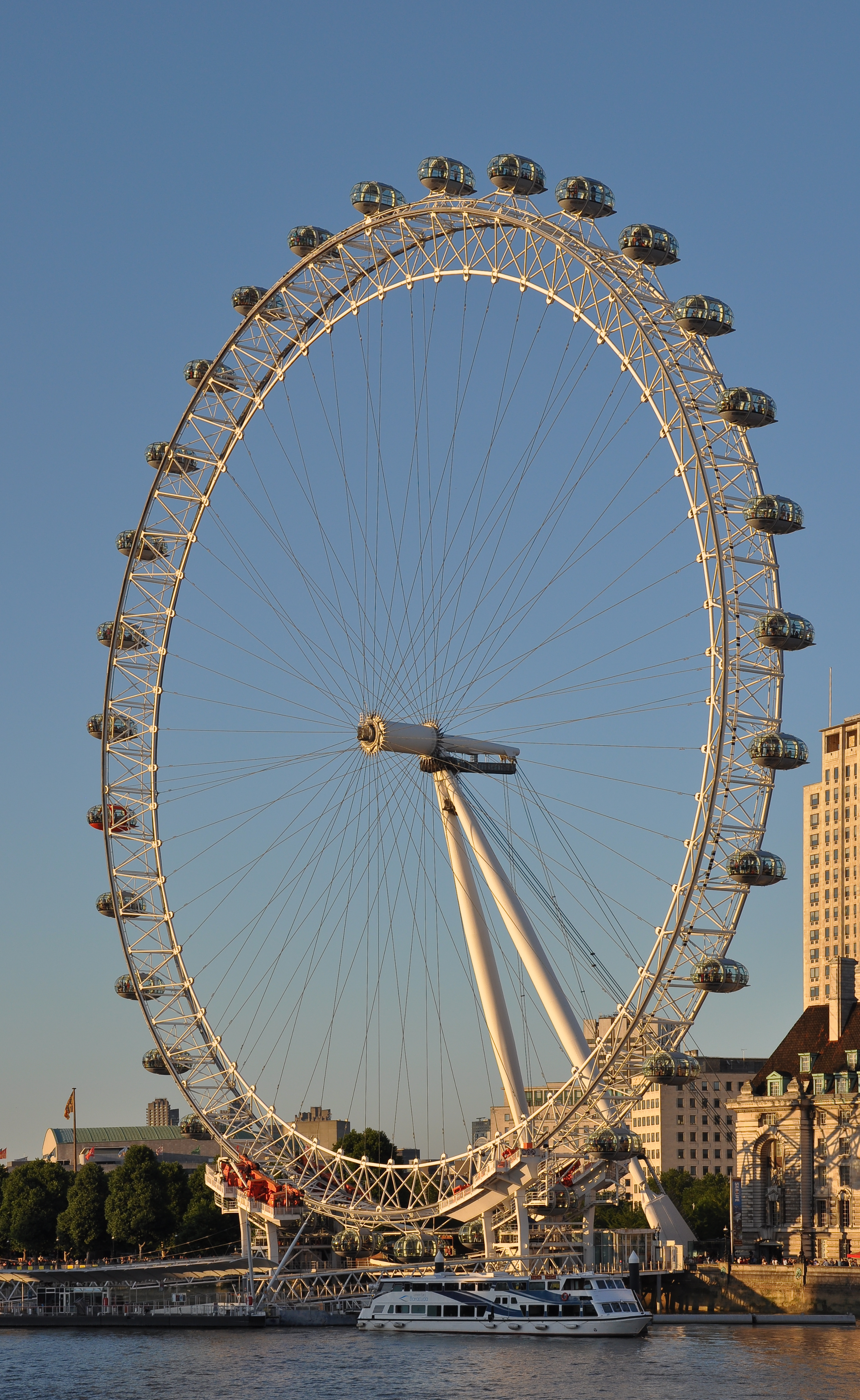
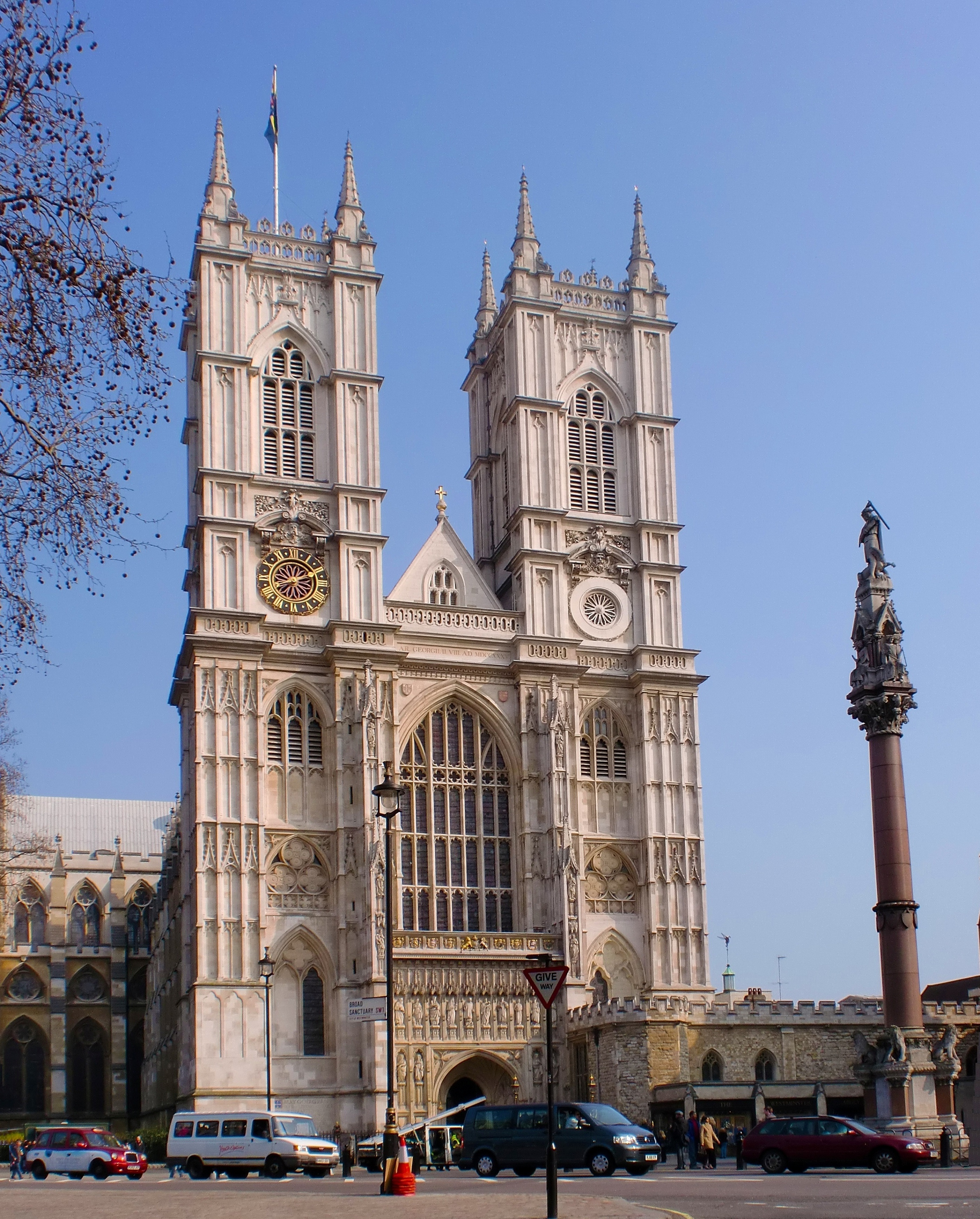
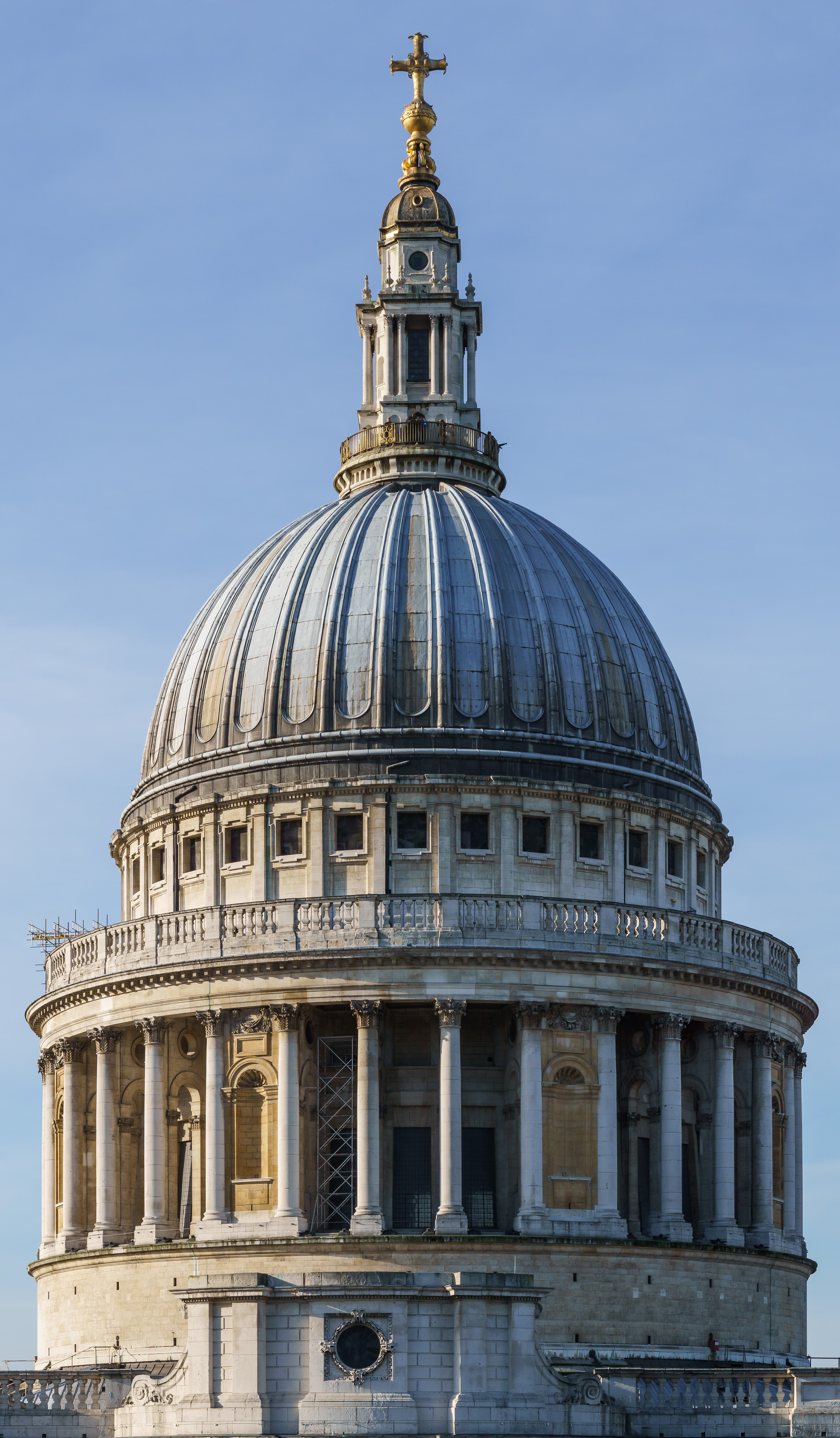
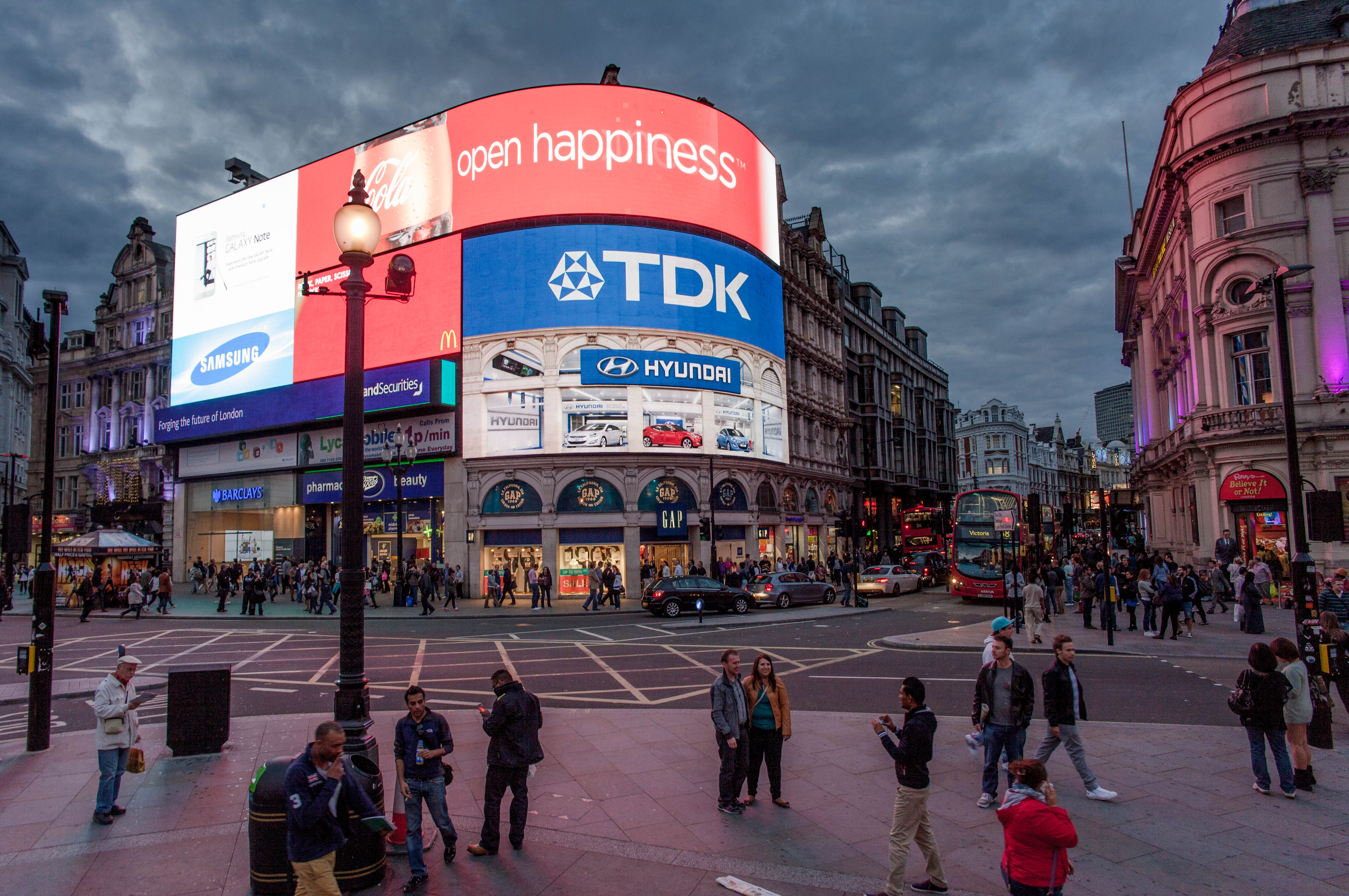
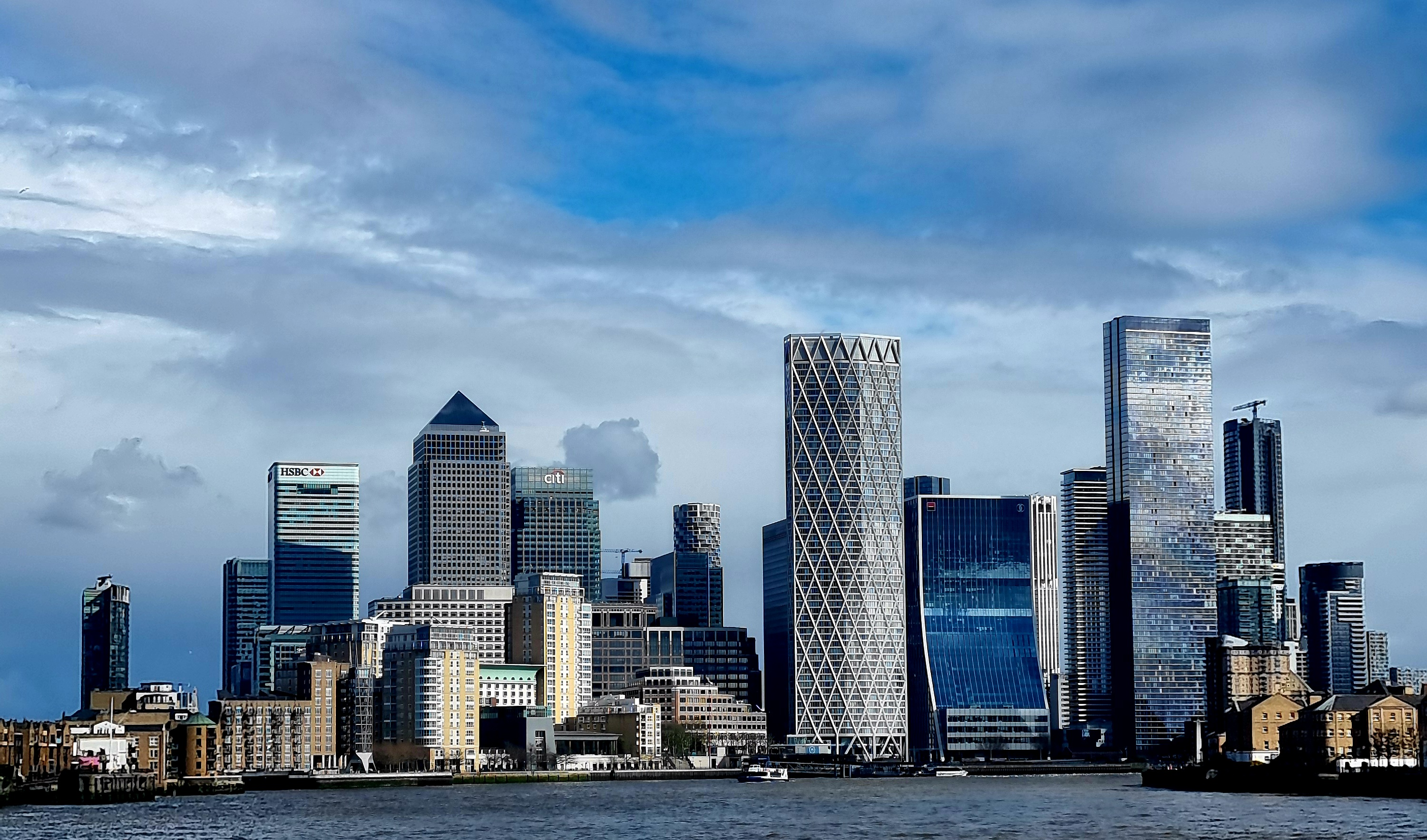
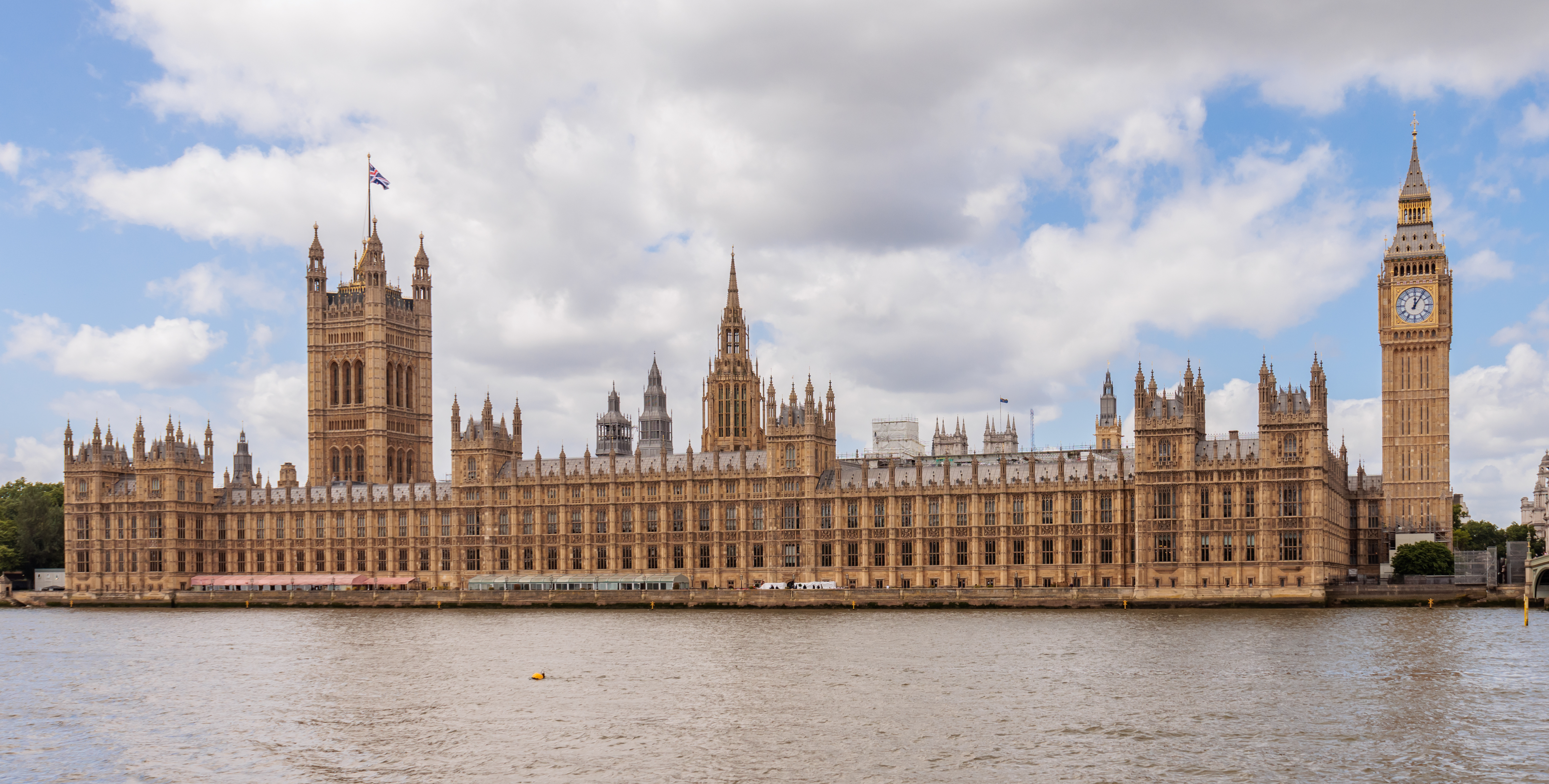
- River Thames and Tower Bridge with The Shard and Southwark (left), and Tower of London and City of London (right) London Eye Westminster Abbey St Paul's Cathedral Piccadilly Circus Canary Wharf Palace of Westminster with Big Ben (right)
- Map of the Greater London administrative area, encompassing the City of London and 32 additional boroughs
- Location within England Location within the United Kingdom Location within Europe
- Coordinates: 51°30′26″N 0°7′39″W
- Sovereign state: United Kingdom
- Country: England
- Region: London
- Ceremonial counties: Greater London; City of London
- Settled by Romans: AD 47; 1979 years ago, as Londinium
- Administrative HQ: City Hall
- Local government: 32 London boroughs, the City of London and Queen's Park parish

Government
  - Type: Executive mayoralty and deliberative assembly
  - Body: Greater London Authority
  - Mayor: Sadiq Khan (L)
  - London Assembly: 14 constituencies
  - UK Parliament: 74 constituencies

Area
  - Total (Note: London region): 607 sq mi (1,572 km^{2})
  - Urban: 671 sq mi (1,738 km^{2})
  - Metro: 3,236 sq mi (8,382 km^{2})

Population (2025)
  - Total (Note: London region): 9,122,909
  - Rank: 1st in the UK; 3rd in Europe
  - Density: 15,030/sq mi (5,804/km^{2})
  - Urban (2021): 10,558,797
  - Metro (Note: London metropolitan area) (2026): 15,400,000
- Demonyms: Londoner

Ethnicity (2021)
  - Ethnic groups: List: 53.8% White; 20.7% Asian; 13.5% Black; 6.3% other; 5.7% Mixed

Religion (2021)
  - Religion: List: 40.7% Christianity; 27.1% no religion; 15.0% Islam; 5.1% Hinduism; 1.7% Judaism; 1.6% Sikhism; 0.9% Buddhism; 1.0% other; 7.0% not stated
- Time zone: UTC+00:00 (GMT)
  - Summer (DST): UTC+01:00 (BST)
- Postcode areas: 22 areas: E, EC, N, NW, SE, SW, W, WC, BR, CM, CR, DA, EN, HA, IG, KT, RM, SM,UB, WD, TN, TW
- Dialling codes: 020; 01689; 01708; 01895
- GSS code: E12000007 (region); E61000001 (GLA)
- GeoTLD: .london
- Website: london.gov.uk

London (Note: /ˈlʌndən/ LUN-dən) is the capital and largest city (Note: Although conventionally considered a city, only the ceremonial county of the City of London and the City of Westminster borough within Greater London hold city status.) of England and the United Kingdom, with a population of 9.14 million people in 2025. Its wider metropolitan area is the largest in Western Europe, with a population of 15.4 million. London stands on the River Thames in southeast England, at the head of a 50-mile (80 km) tidal estuary down to the North Sea, and has been a major settlement for nearly 2,000 years. Its ancient core and financial centre, the City of London, was founded by the Romans as Londinium and has retained its medieval boundaries. (Note: See also: Independent city § National capitals.) The City of Westminster, to the west of the City of London, has been the site of the national government and parliament for centuries. London grew rapidly in the 19th century, becoming the world's largest city at the time. Since the 19th century the name "London" has referred to the metropolis around the City of London, historically split among the counties of Middlesex, Essex, Surrey, Kent and Hertfordshire. Since 1965 it has largely comprised the administrative area of Greater London, governed by 33 local authorities and the Greater London Authority. (Note: The Greater London Authority consists of the Mayor of London and the London Assembly. The London Mayor is distinguished from the Lord Mayor of London, who heads the City of London Corporation running the City of London.)

As one of the world's major global cities, and ranked as Alpha++, London exerts a strong influence on world art, architecture, culture, cinema, entertainment, commerce, finance, education, healthcare, media, science, technology, tourism, transport and communications. London is Europe's largest city economy and one of the world's major financial centres. London is home to several of the world's leading academic institutions, such as the London School of Economics and Imperial College London, and hosts Europe's largest concentration of higher education institutions, comprising over 50 universities and colleges collectively enrolling more than 500,000 students in 2023. It is the most-visited city in Europe and has the world's busiest city airport system. The London Underground is the world's oldest rapid transit system.

London's diverse cultures encompass over 300 languages. The 2025 population of Greater London of just over 9.8 million made it Europe's third-most populous city, accounting for 13.1 per cent of the United Kingdom's population and 15.5 per cent of England's population. The Greater London Built-up Area is the fourth-most populous in Europe, with about 9.8 million inhabitants as of 2011. The London metropolitan area is the third-most-populous in Europe, with about 15 million inhabitants (referred to as Londoners) as of 2025, making London a megacity. (Note: According to the European Statistical Agency (Eurostat), London had the largest Larger Urban Zone in the EU. Eurostat uses the sum of the populations of the contiguous urban core and the surrounding commuting zone as its definition.)

Landmarks include the Tower of London, Westminster Abbey, Buckingham Palace, the London Eye, Piccadilly Circus, St Paul's Cathedral, Tower Bridge, Trafalgar Square, the Palace of Westminster; and the historic village of Greenwich where the Royal Observatory defines the Prime Meridian (0° longitude) and Greenwich Mean Time. The city has the most museums, art galleries, libraries and cultural venues in the UK, including the British Museum, the National Gallery, the Natural History Museum, Tate Modern, the British Library and numerous West End theatres. Annual sporting events include the FA Cup Final (held at Wembley Stadium), the Wimbledon Tennis Championships and the London Marathon. It became the first city to host three Summer Olympic Games upon hosting the 2012 Summer Olympics after previously hosting in 1908 and 1948.

== Etymology ==
The name London is attested in the first century AD, usually in the Latinised form Londinium. Modern scientific analyses of the name must account for the origins of the different forms that are found in early sources, such as Latin Londinium, Old English Lunden, and Welsh Llundein, with reference to the known developments over time of sounds in those different languages. The name came into these languages from Common Brythonic; the lost Celtic form of the name was most likely *Londonjon.

Until 1889, the name "London" applied officially only to the City of London, but since then it has also denoted the County of London and Greater London.

== History ==
=== Prehistory ===
In 1993, remains of a Bronze Age bridge were found on the south River Thames foreshore, upstream from Vauxhall Bridge. Two of the timbers were radiocarbon dated to 1750–1285 BC. In 2010 foundations of a large timber structure, dated to 4800–4500 BC, were found on the Thames' south foreshore downstream from Vauxhall Bridge. Both are located on the south bank of the Thames, where the now-underground River Effra flows into the Thames.

=== Roman London ===
Inscription from Londinium, held at the Museum of London, with the Romans' first mention of the Londiniensi ('Londoners')

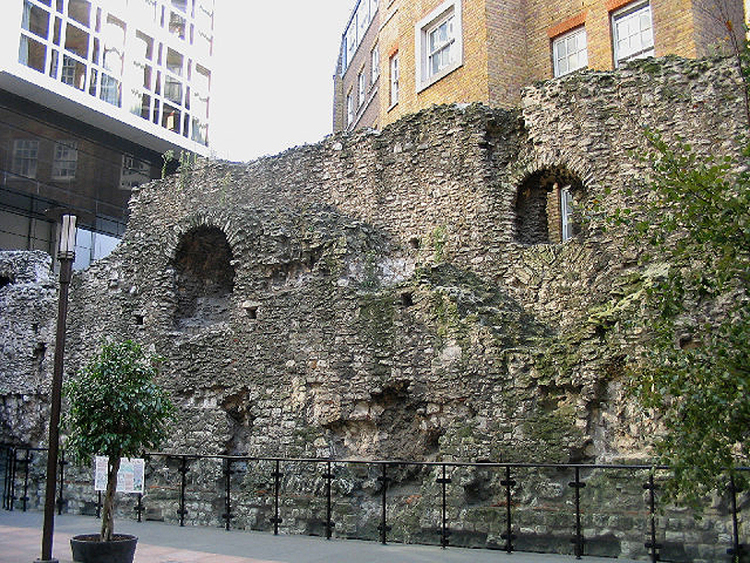
A surviving section of the 3rd-century London Wall behind Tower Hill

Despite the evidence of scattered Brythonic settlements in the area, the first major settlement was founded by the Romans around AD 47, about 4 years after their invasion of AD 43. This only lasted until about AD 61, when the Iceni tribe led by Queen Boudica stormed it and burnt it to the ground.

The next planned incarnation of Londinium prospered, superseding Colchester as the principal city of the Roman province of Britannia in 100. At its height in the 2nd century, Roman London had a population of about 60,000.

=== Anglo-Saxon and Viking-period London ===
With the early-5th-century collapse of Roman rule, the walled city of Londinium was effectively abandoned, although Roman civilisation continued around St Martin-in-the-Fields until about 450. From about 500 an Anglo-Saxon settlement known as Lundenwic developed slightly west of the old Roman city. By about 680 the city had become a major port again, but there is little evidence of large-scale production. From the 820s repeated Viking assaults brought decline.

The Vikings applied Danelaw over much of eastern and northern England from 886; The Anglo-Saxon Chronicle records that Alfred "refounded" London that year. This involved the abandonment of Lundenwic and a revival of life and trade within the old Roman walls. London then grew slowly until a dramatic increase in about 950.

By the 11th century, London was the largest town in England. Westminster Abbey, rebuilt in Romanesque style by King Edward the Confessor, was one of the grandest churches in Europe. Winchester had been the capital of Anglo-Saxon England, but from this time, London became the main forum for foreign traders and the base for defence in time of war. In the view of Frank Stenton: "It had the resources, and it was rapidly developing the dignity and the political self-consciousness appropriate to a national capital."

=== Middle Ages ===
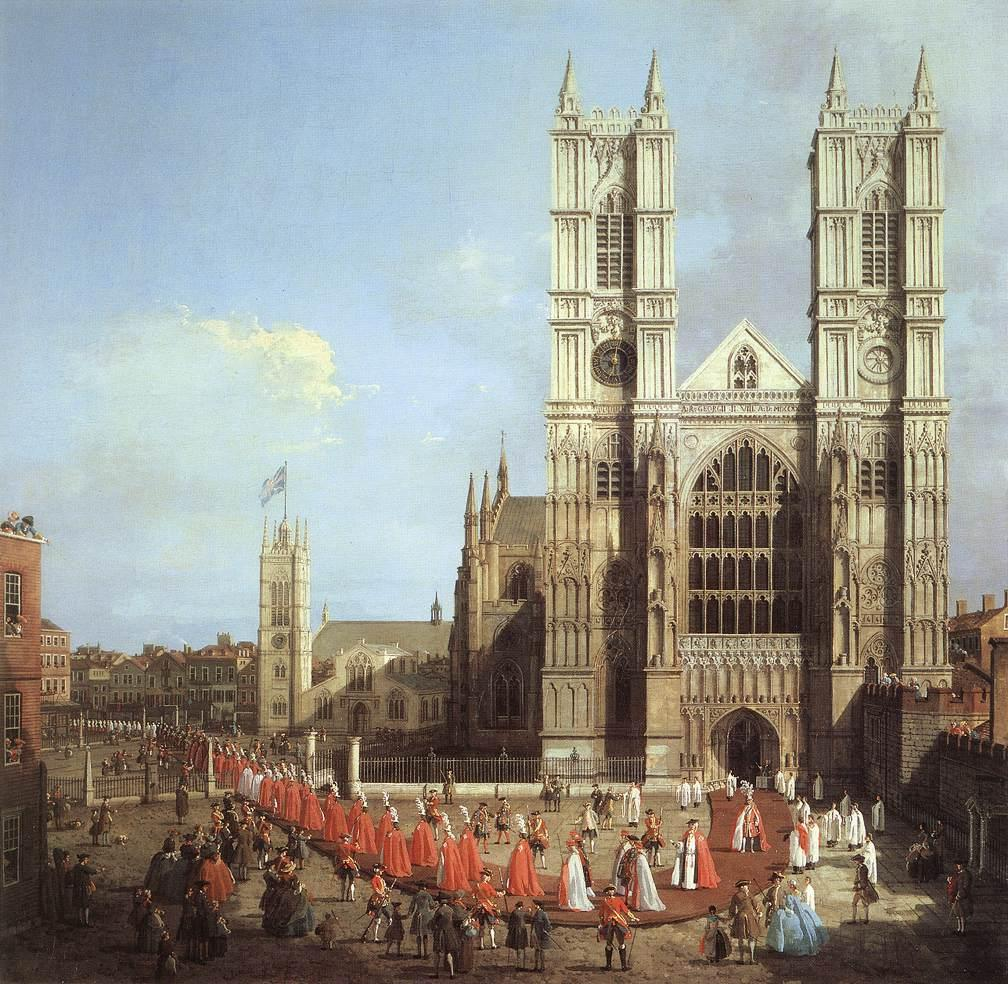
Westminster Abbey, as seen in this painting (Canaletto, 1749), is a World Heritage Site and one of London's oldest buildings.

After winning the Battle of Hastings, William, Duke of Normandy, was crowned King of England as William I in the newly completed Westminster Abbey on Christmas Day 1066. He built the Tower of London to intimidate the inhabitants. In 1097 William II began building Westminster Hall, near the abbey. It became the basis of a new Palace of Westminster.

In the 12th century the institutions of central government, which had followed the royal English court around the country, grew in size and sophistication and became increasingly fixed, for most purposes at Westminster, although the royal treasury came to rest in the Tower of London. While the City of Westminster developed into a true governmental capital, its distinct neighbour, the City of London, remained England's largest city and principal commercial centre and flourished under its own unique administration, the Corporation of London. In 1100, its population was some 18,000; by 1300, it had grown to nearly 100,000. With the Black Death in the mid-14th century, London lost nearly a third of its population. London was the focus of the Peasants' Revolt in 1381.

London was a centre of England's Jewish population before their expulsion by Edward I in 1290. Violence against Jews occurred in 1190, when it was rumoured that Richard I had ordered their massacre after some of their leaders had presented themselves at his coronation. In 1264, during the Second Barons' War, Simon de Montfort's rebels killed 500 Jews while attempting to seize records of debts.

=== Early modern ===
The Reformation produced a shift to Protestantism. Much property passed into private ownership, accelerating business in the city. In 1475 the Hanseatic League set up a trading base. Woollen cloth was shipped undyed from 14th- and 15th-century London to the Low Countries. The reopening of the Netherlands to English shipping in January 1565 spurred a burst of commercial activity. Mercantilism grew and monopoly traders such as the East India Company were founded as trade expanded to the New World. London became the main North Sea port, with migrants from England and abroad. The population rose from about 50,000 in 1530 to about 225,000 in 1605. Shakespeare built his Globe Theatre in Southwark in 1599. Stage performances halted when Puritan authorities shut down the theatres in the 1640s. The ban was lifted during the 1660 Restoration; London's oldest theatre, Drury Lane, opened in 1663. By the end of the Tudor period in 1603, London was still compact. There was an assassination attempt on James I in Westminster, in the Gunpowder Plot of 5 November 1605. In 1637 the government of Charles I attempted to reform London's administration; the Corporation made "The Great Refusal", explaining the City of London's unique governmental status.

In the English Civil War, most Londoners supported the Roundheads. After an advance by the Cavaliers in 1642, culminating in the battles of Brentford and Turnham Green, London was surrounded by a defensive perimeter wall. The fortifications failed their only test when the New Model Army entered London in 1647. London suffered the Great Plague of 1665–1666, killing some 100,000 people, a fifth of the population. In 1666, the Great Fire destroyed much of the wooden-built city. Rebuilding took over 10 years, supervised by the polymath Robert Hooke.

In 1710, Christopher Wren's masterpiece St Paul's Cathedral was completed, replacing its medieval predecessor, lost in the Great Fire. Its dome dominated the London skyline for centuries, inspiring William Blake, whose 1789 poem "Holy Thursday" mentions 'the high dome of Pauls'. During the Georgian era new districts such as Mayfair were formed in the west, while new bridges encouraged development in South London. In the east, the Port of London expanded downstream, while the financial centre matured. In 1762 George III acquired Buckingham House. During the 18th century London was dogged by crime, and the Bow Street Runners were established in 1750 as a professional police force. Epidemics during the 1720s and 30s saw most children born in the city die before reaching their fifth birthday. Growing literacy and printed papers made news widely available; Fleet Street became the centre of the British press, and Londoners debated in coffeehouses. Napoleon's invasion of Amsterdam led many financiers to relocate to London and the first London international issue was arranged in 1817. The Royal Navy became the world's leading war fleet, acting as a deterrent to economic adversaries. Following an 1838 fire, the Royal Exchange was rebuilt in 1844. The 1846 repeal of the Corn Laws, meant to weaken Dutch economic power, enabled London to overtake Amsterdam as the leading international financial centre.

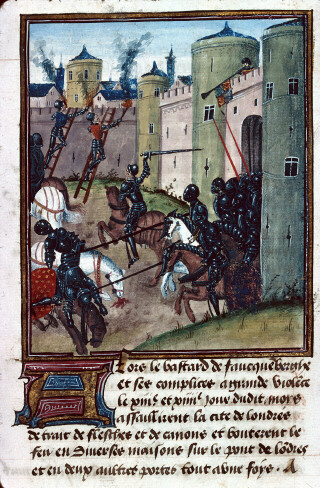
The Lancastrian siege of London in 1471 is attacked by a Yorkist sally.

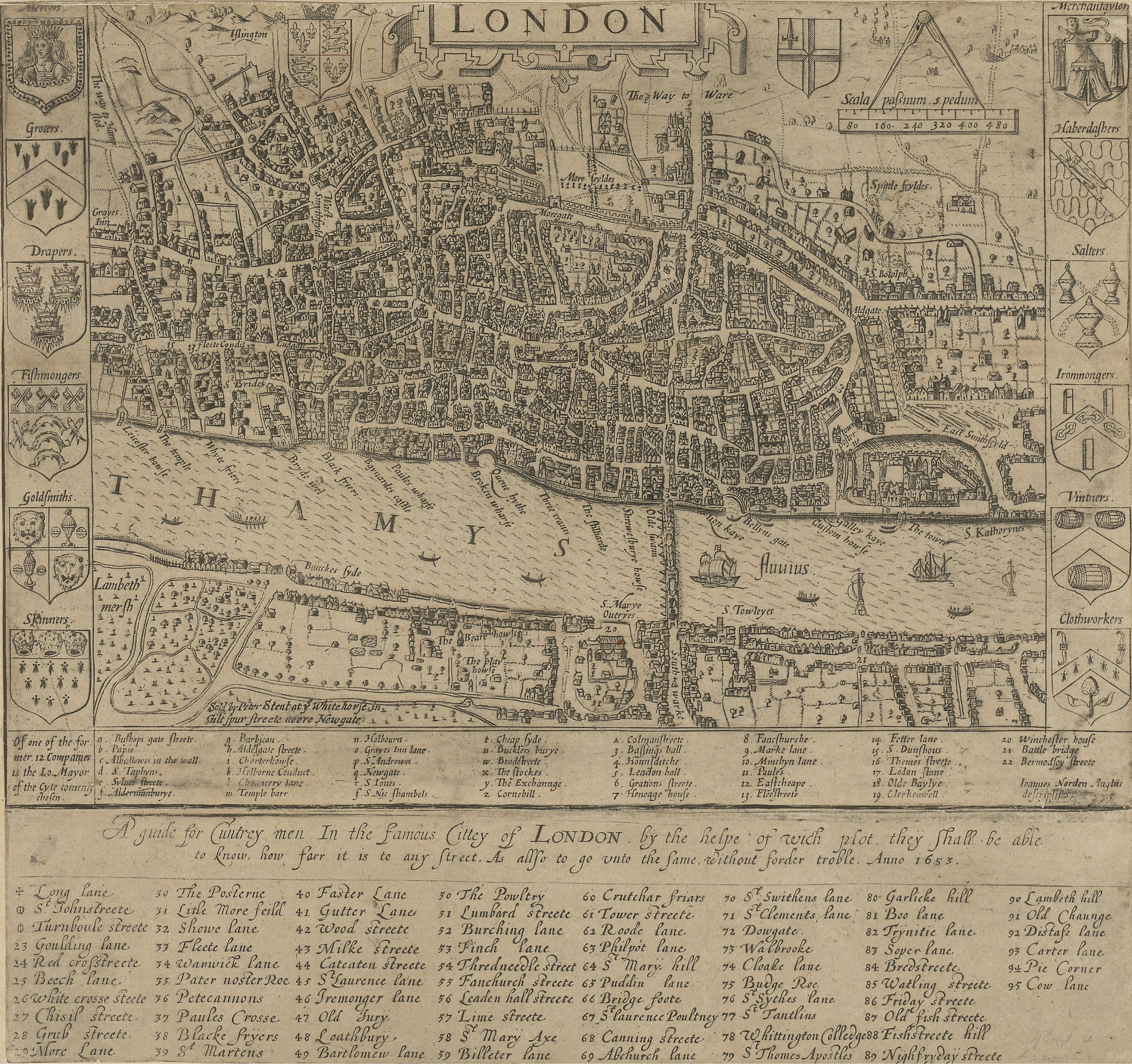
Map of London in 1593. There is only one bridge across the Thames, but parts of Southwark on the south bank of the river have been developed.

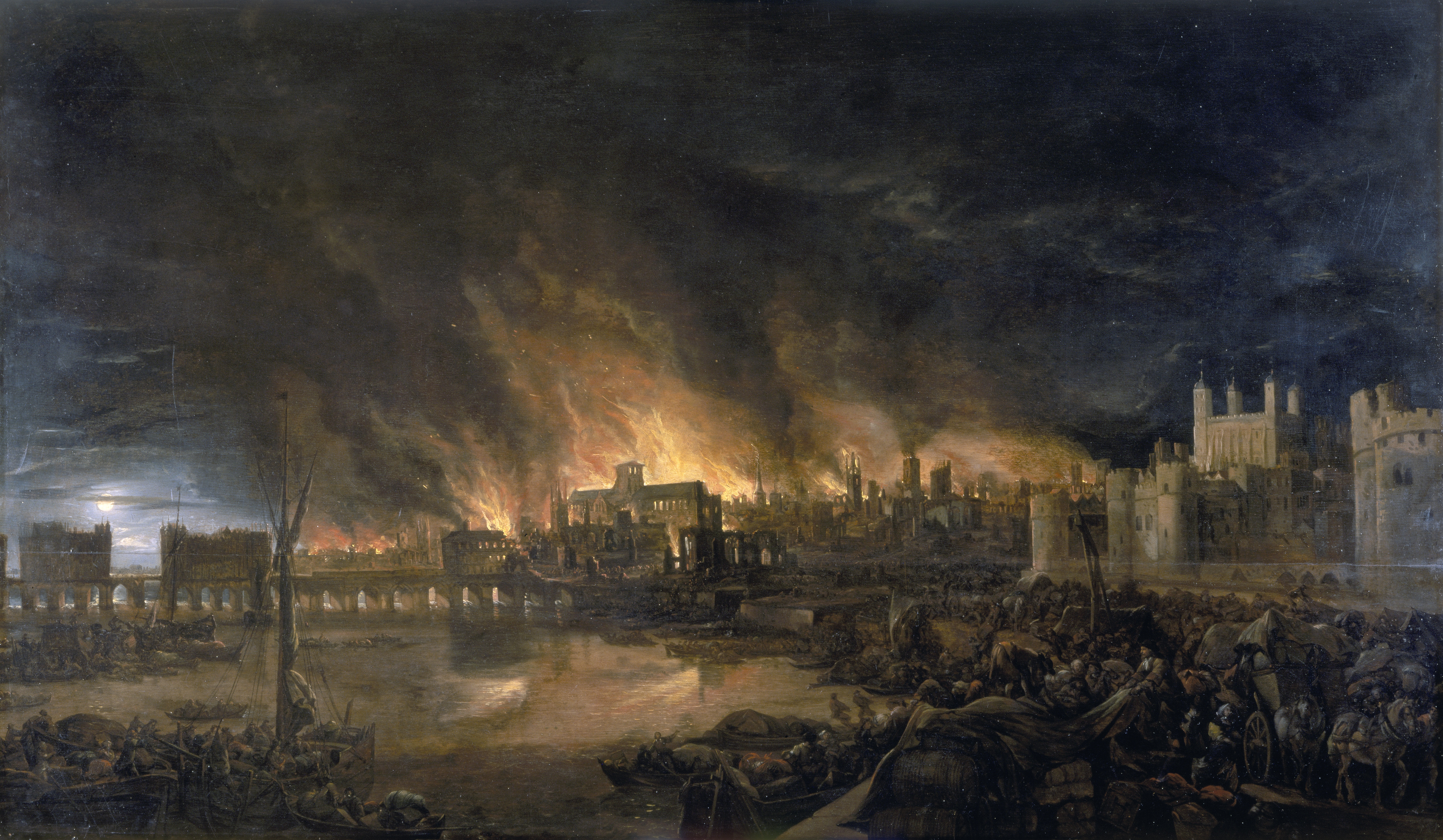
The Great Fire of London destroyed much of the city in 1666.

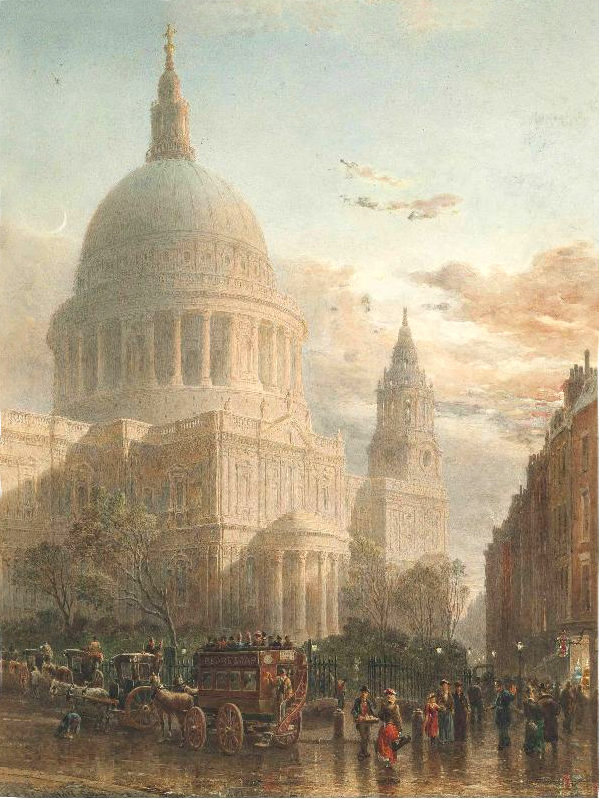
St Paul's Cathedral (painted by Edward Goodall in 1850) was completed in 1710.

=== Late modern and contemporary ===
The Industrial Revolution saw unprecedented urbanisation. London was the world's largest city from about 1831 to 1925, with a population density of 132 per acre (325 per hectare). Harding, Howell & Co. on Pall Mall was one of the first department stores, alongside many street sellers. The London Underground, the world's first urban rail network, was created in response to traffic congestion. Overcrowding led to cholera epidemics, claiming 14,000 lives in 1848, and 6,000 in 1866. A modern sewage system was created by the Metropolitan Board of Works; it diverted waste to the Thames Estuary, and by the 1890s used biological treatment of sewage to oxidise the waste. The Metropolitan Board of Works oversaw infrastructure expansion in the capital and some surrounding counties. In 1894, Lyons opened their first chain of teashops in Piccadilly. Tearooms became popular meeting places for women from the suffrage movement. Westminster Abbey and St Paul's Cathedral were bombed in the 1912–14 suffragette bombing and arson campaign.

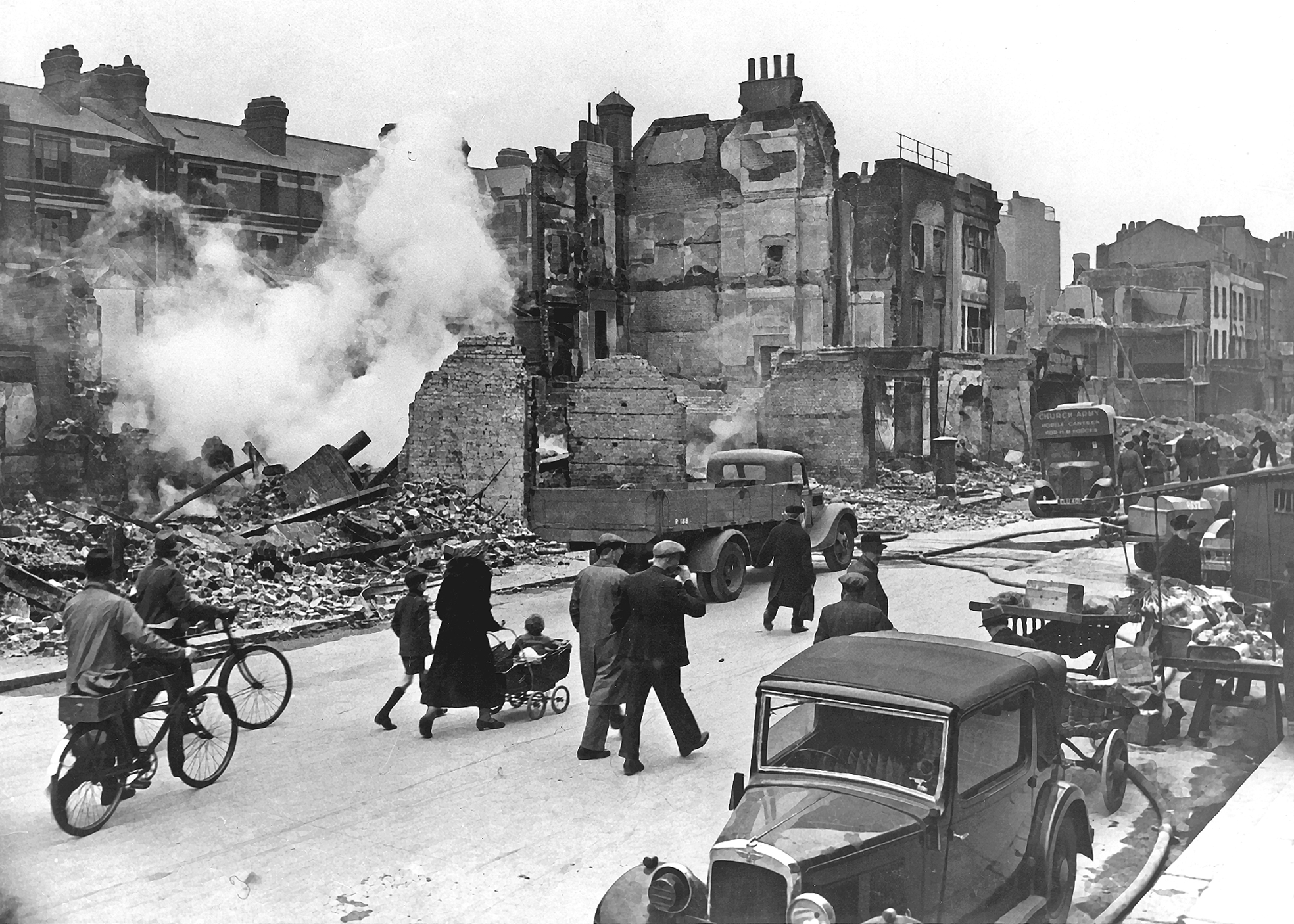
A bombed-out London street during the Blitz in 1940

London was bombed by the Germans in the First World War. During the Second World War, the Blitz killed over 30,000 Londoners, destroying many buildings. The tomb of the Unknown Warrior was created in Westminster Abbey on 11 November 1920 and The Cenotaph, in Whitehall, was unveiled on the same day; it is the focus the National Service of Remembrance held annually on Remembrance Sunday. The 1948 Summer Olympics were held at the original Wembley Stadium, while London was still recovering from the war. From the 1940s, London became home to many immigrants, primarily from Commonwealth countries such as Jamaica, India, Bangladesh and Pakistan, making London one of the most multiracial cities in the world. In 1951 the Festival of Britain was held on the South Bank. The Great Smog of 1952 led to the Clean Air Act 1956, which ended the "pea soup fogs" which had earned London the nickname the "Big Smoke".

In the mid-1960s, London became a centre for worldwide youth culture, exemplified by the Swinging London sub-culture of the King's Road, Chelsea and Carnaby Street. The role of trendsetter revived in the punk era. In 1965 London's political boundaries were expanded in response to the city's growth, and a new Greater London Council was created. During the Troubles in Northern Ireland, London was hit by bomb attacks by the Provisional Irish Republican Army beginning in 1973. These attacks lasted for two decades, starting with the Old Bailey bombing. Greater London's population declined after the Second World War, from an estimated peak of 8.6 million in 1939 to around 6.8 million in the 1980s. By January 2015 Greater London's population had increased again to 8.63 million. The principal ports for London moved downstream to Felixstowe and Tilbury, with the London Docklands area becoming a focus for regeneration. 2 miles (3.2 km) east of central London, the Thames Barrier was completed in 1982 to protect London against tidal surges from the North Sea.

The Greater London Council was abolished in 1986, leaving London with no central administration until the creation of the Greater London Authority in 2000. To mark the 21st century the Millennium Dome, the London Eye and the Millennium Bridge were constructed. On 7 July 2005, three London Underground trains and a double-decker bus were bombed in a series of terrorist attacks. In 2008 Time magazine hailed London as one of the world's three most influential global cities. In terms of international connectedness, as of 2024, London was one of two cities worldwide classified as an "Alpha++" city by the Globalization and World Cities Research Network.

== Administration ==
=== Local government and services ===
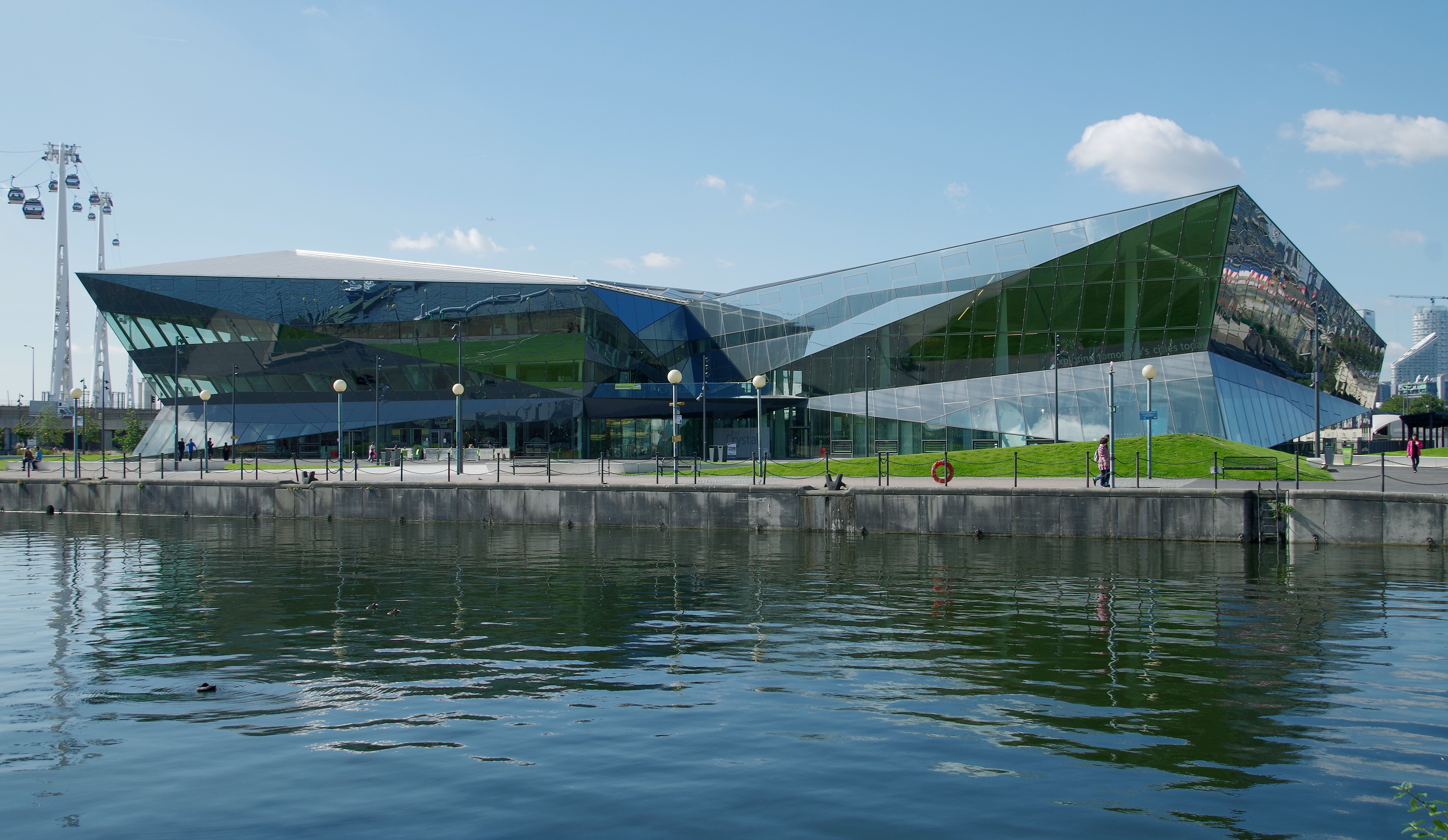
City Hall seen across Royal Victoria Dock, headquarters of the Greater London Authority (GLA) since 2022

The administration of London is formed of two tiers: a citywide, strategic tier coordinated by the Greater London Authority (GLA), and a local tier with 33 local administrations. The GLA consists of the mayor of London, who has executive powers, and the London Assembly, which scrutinises the mayor's decisions and can accept or reject the mayor's annual budget proposals. The GLA is responsible for most of London's transport system through Transport for London (TfL), overseeing the city's police and fire services, and setting a strategic vision for London through the London Plan. The headquarters of the GLA is City Hall in Newham. The mayor since 2016 has been Sadiq Khan of the Labour Party.

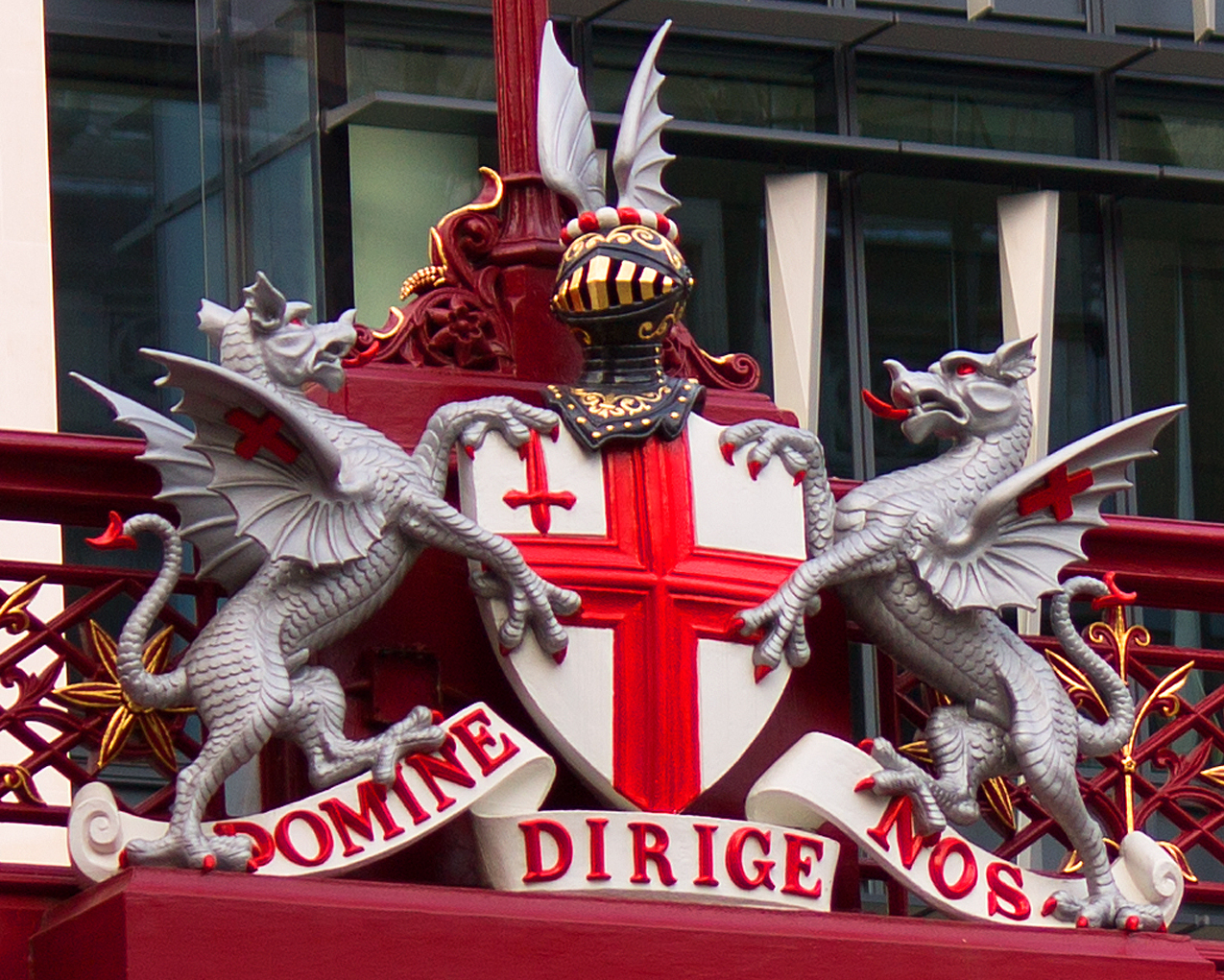
Arms of the Corporation of the City of London since 1381

The local authorities are the councils of the 32 London boroughs and the City of London Corporation. They are responsible for most local services, including local planning, schools, libraries, leisure and recreation, social services, local roads and refuse collection. Some functions, such as waste management, are provided through joint arrangements. In 2009–2010 the revenue expenditure by London councils and the GLA amounted to just over £22 billion (£14.7 billion for the boroughs and £7.4 billion for the GLA).

The London Fire Brigade is the statutory fire and rescue service for Greater London, run by the London Fire and Emergency Planning Authority. National Health Service ambulance services are provided by the London Ambulance Service (LAS) NHS Trust. The London Air Ambulance charity operates in conjunction with the LAS where required. His Majesty's Coastguard and the Royal National Lifeboat Institution operate on the River Thames, under the jurisdiction of the Port of London Authority from Teddington Lock to the sea.

Policing in Greater London, with the exception of the City of London, is provided by the Metropolitan Police ("The Met"), overseen by the mayor through the Mayor's Office for Policing and Crime. The British Transport Police are responsible for police services on National Rail, London Underground, Docklands Light Railway and Tramlink services. The Ministry of Defence Police is a specialised police force in London.

=== National government ===
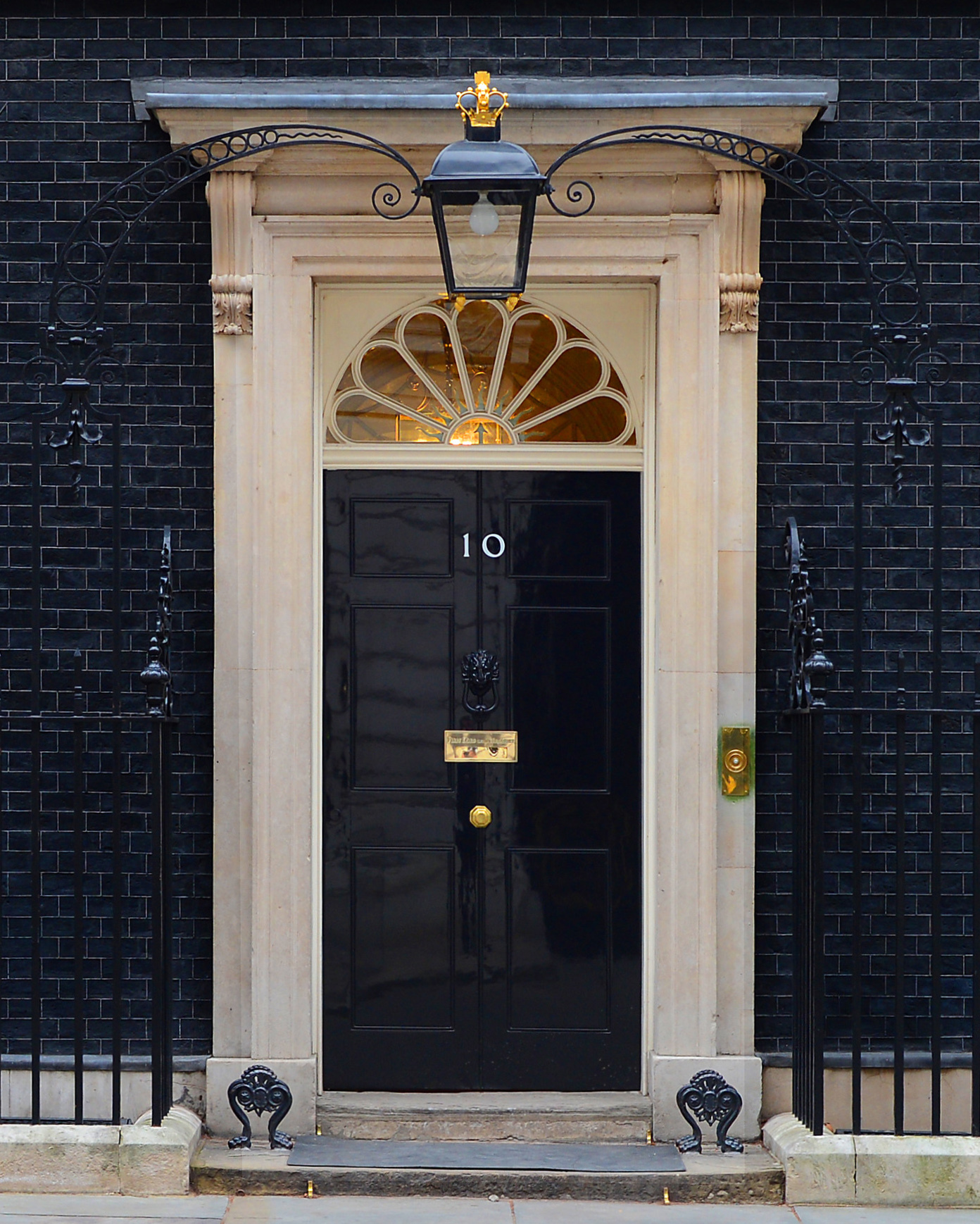
10 Downing Street, official residence of the Prime Minister

London is the seat of the Government of the United Kingdom. Many government departments and the prime minister's residence at 10 Downing Street are based close to the Palace of Westminster, particularly along Whitehall. There are 75 members of Parliament from London; as at June 2024, 59 are from the Labour Party, 9 are Conservatives, 6 are Liberal Democrats and one constituency is held by an independent. The ministerial post of Minister for London was created in 1994; it has been vacant since July 2024.

== Geography ==
=== Scope ===
Greater London is one of nine regions of England and the top subdivision covering most of the metropolis. The City of London at its core once comprised the whole settlement; as its urban area grew, the Corporation of London resisted attempts to amalgamate the city with its suburbs, causing "London" to be defined several ways.

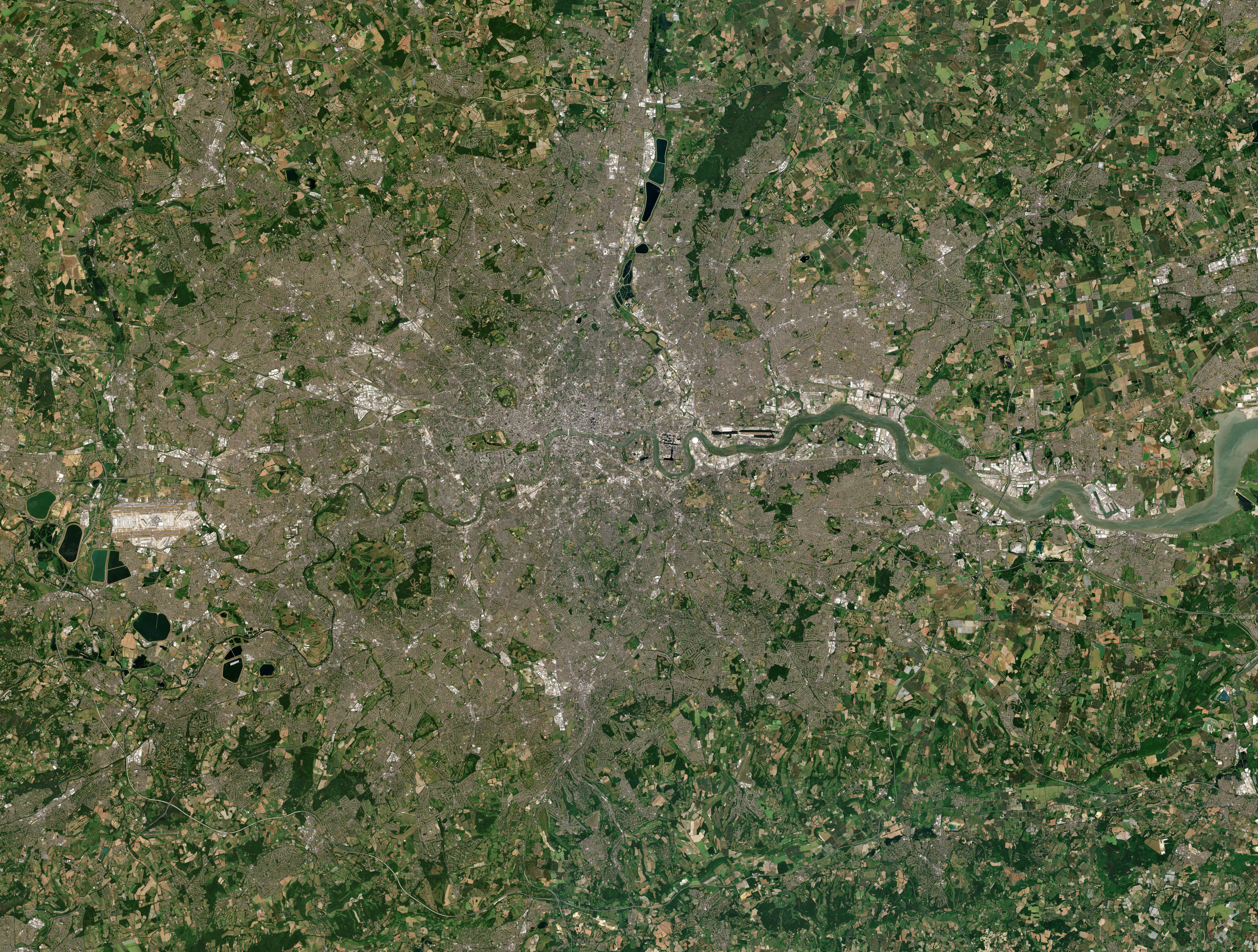
Satellite view of London in June 2018

Map of London in 2026

Forty per cent of Greater London is covered by the London post town, in which "London" forms part of postal addresses. The London telephone area code (020) covers an area similar in size to Greater London, although some outer districts are excluded and some just outside included. The London linked-number area extends 18 miles around Kings Cross, see Director telephone system. The Greater London boundary has been aligned to the M25 motorway in places.

Urban expansion is prevented by the Metropolitan Green Belt, although the built-up area extends beyond the boundary in places, producing a separately defined Greater London Urban Area. Beyond this is the London commuter belt. Greater London is split for some purposes into Inner London and Outer London, and by the River Thames into North and South, with an informal Central London area. The coordinates of the nominal "centre of London", traditionally the original Eleanor Cross at Charing Cross near the junction of Trafalgar Square and Whitehall, are about 51°30′26″N 00°07′39″W.

=== Status ===
Within London, the City of London and the City of Westminster have city status. The City of London and the remainder of Greater London are ceremonial counties. Greater London includes parts of the historic counties of Middlesex, Kent, Surrey, Essex and Hertfordshire. Greater London has been defined as a region of England.

London is the capital of the United Kingdom and of England by convention. The capital of England was moved from Winchester as the Palace of Westminster developed in the 12th and 13th centuries to become the home of the royal court, and thus the nation's political capital. The city has four World Heritage Sites: Kew Gardens; the Tower of London; the site featuring the Palace of Westminster, the Church of St Margaret, and Westminster Abbey; and the historic settlement in Greenwich where the Royal Observatory defines the prime meridian (0° longitude) and Greenwich Mean Time.

=== Topography ===
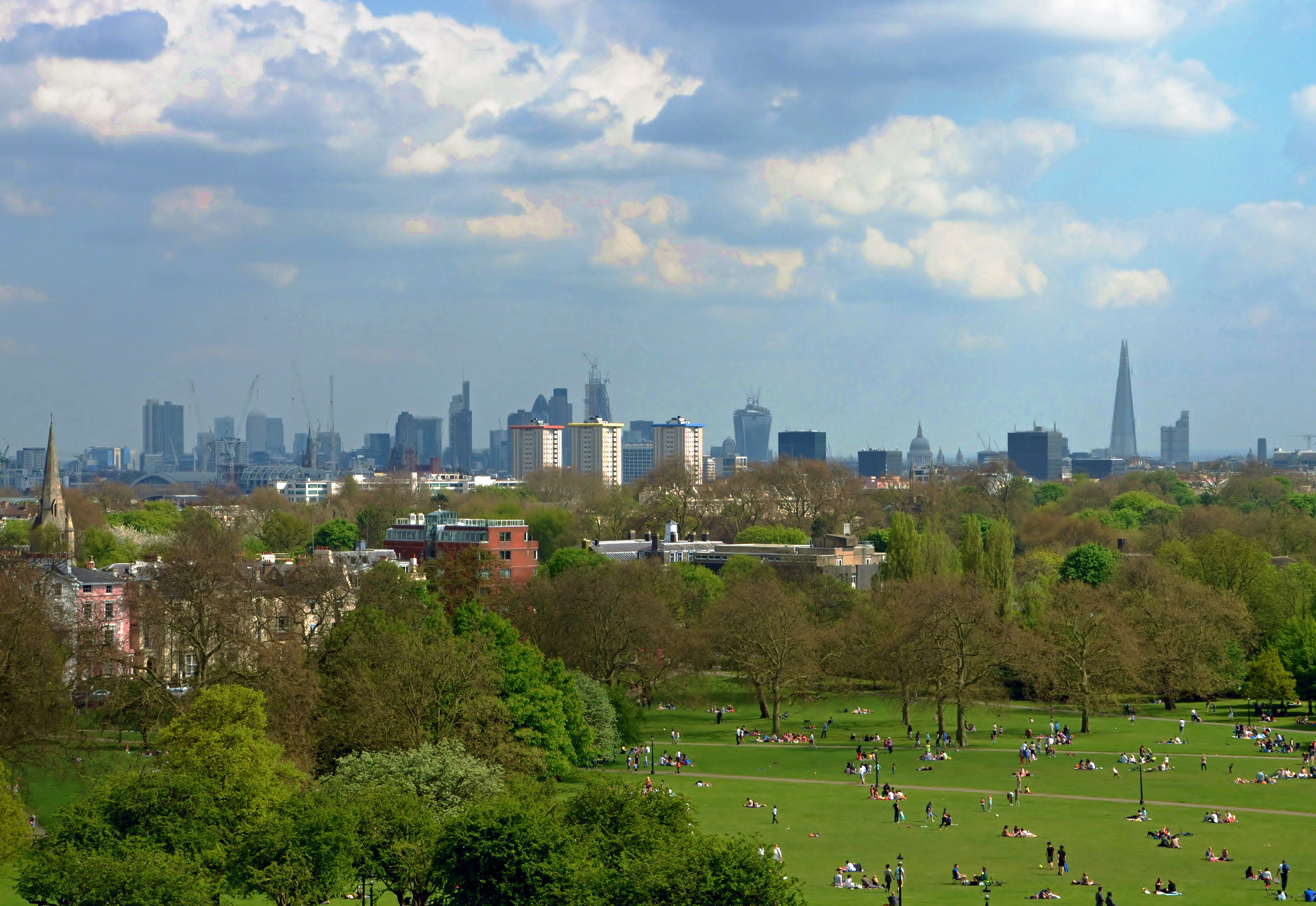
London from Primrose Hill

Greater London has an area of 611 square miles (1,583 km^{2}), while the London Metropolitan Region has an area of 3,236 square miles (8,382 km^{2}).

Modern London stands on the Thames, its primary geographical feature, a navigable river which crosses the city from the south-west to the east. The Thames Valley is a flood plain surrounded by gently rolling hills including Parliament Hill, Addington Hills, and Primrose Hill. Historically, London grew up at the river's lowest bridging point. The Thames was once much broader and shallower with extensive wetlands; at high tide, its shores reached five times their present width.

Since the Victorian era the Thames has been embanked, and many of its London tributaries now flow underground. The Thames is tidal, and London is vulnerable to flooding. The threat has increased because of a continuous rise in high water level caused by climate change and by the slow 'tilting' of the British Isles through post-glacial rebound.

=== Climate ===
London has a temperate oceanic climate (Köppen: Cfb). The average annual precipitation is about 600 mm (24 in). Despite relatively low annual precipitation, London receives 109.6 rainy days on the 1 mm (0.039 in) threshold annually. London is vulnerable to climate change, and experts are concerned that households may run out of water before 2050.

Summers are generally warm, sometimes hot. London's average July high is 23.5 °C (74.3 °F). On average each year, London experiences 31 days above 25 °C (77.0 °F) and 4.2 days above 30.0 °C (86.0 °F). Winters are generally cool with little temperature variation. Heavy snow is rare, but snow usually falls at least once each winter. As a large city, London has a considerable urban heat island effect, making the centre of London at times 5 °C (9 °F) warmer than the suburbs and outskirts.

Climate data for London (LHR), (Note: Averages are taken from Heathrow, and extremes are taken from stations across London.) elevation: 25 m (82 ft), 1991–2020 normals
Month	Jan	Feb	Mar	Apr	May	Jun	Jul	Aug	Sep	Oct	Nov	Dec	Year
Record high °C (°F)	17.2 (63.0)	21.2 (70.2)	24.5 (76.1)	29.4 (84.9)	35.1 (95.2)	36.4 (97.5)	40.2 (104.4)	38.2 (100.8)	35.0 (95.0)	29.5 (85.1)	21.1 (70.0)	17.4 (63.3)	40.2 (104.4)
Mean maximum °C (°F)	13.3 (55.9)	14.3 (57.7)	17.6 (63.7)	22.2 (72.0)	26.2 (79.2)	29.4 (84.9)	31.2 (88.2)	30.6 (87.1)	26.2 (79.2)	21.0 (69.8)	16.7 (62.1)	13.9 (57.0)	32.6 (90.7)
Mean daily maximum °C (°F)	8.4 (47.1)	9.0 (48.2)	11.7 (53.1)	15.0 (59.0)	18.4 (65.1)	21.6 (70.9)	23.9 (75.0)	23.4 (74.1)	20.2 (68.4)	15.8 (60.4)	11.5 (52.7)	8.8 (47.8)	15.7 (60.3)
Daily mean °C (°F)	5.6 (42.1)	5.8 (42.4)	7.9 (46.2)	10.5 (50.9)	13.7 (56.7)	16.8 (62.2)	19.0 (66.2)	18.7 (65.7)	15.9 (60.6)	12.3 (54.1)	8.4 (47.1)	5.9 (42.6)	11.7 (53.1)
Mean daily minimum °C (°F)	2.7 (36.9)	2.7 (36.9)	4.1 (39.4)	6.0 (42.8)	9.1 (48.4)	12.0 (53.6)	14.2 (57.6)	14.1 (57.4)	11.6 (52.9)	8.8 (47.8)	5.3 (41.5)	3.1 (37.6)	7.8 (46.0)
Mean minimum °C (°F)	−3.7 (25.3)	−3.3 (26.1)	−1.5 (29.3)	0.4 (32.7)	3.3 (37.9)	7.3 (45.1)	10.2 (50.4)	9.2 (48.6)	6.4 (43.5)	2.4 (36.3)	−1.3 (29.7)	−3.4 (25.9)	−5.3 (22.5)
Record low °C (°F)	−16.1 (3.0)	−13.9 (7.0)	−8.9 (16.0)	−5.6 (21.9)	−3.1 (26.4)	−0.6 (30.9)	3.9 (39.0)	2.1 (35.8)	1.4 (34.5)	−5.5 (22.1)	−7.1 (19.2)	−17.4 (0.7)	−17.4 (0.7)
Average precipitation mm (inches)	58.8 (2.31)	45.0 (1.77)	38.8 (1.53)	42.3 (1.67)	45.9 (1.81)	47.3 (1.86)	45.8 (1.80)	52.8 (2.08)	49.6 (1.95)	65.1 (2.56)	66.6 (2.62)	57.1 (2.25)	615.0 (24.21)
Average precipitation days (≥ 1.0 mm)	11.5	9.5	8.5	8.8	8.0	8.3	7.9	8.4	7.9	10.8	11.2	10.8	111.7
Average relative humidity (%)	84	78	73	67	68	69	67	71	75	82	85	85	75
Average dew point °C (°F)	3 (37)	2 (36)	3 (37)	4 (39)	7 (45)	10 (50)	12 (54)	12 (54)	11 (52)	9 (48)	6 (43)	5 (41)	7 (45)
Mean monthly sunshine hours	61.1	78.8	124.5	176.7	207.5	208.4	217.8	202.1	157.1	115.2	70.7	55.0	1,674.8
Percentage possible sunshine	23	28	31	40	41	41	42	45	40	35	27	21	35
Average ultraviolet index	1	1	2	4	5	6	6	5	4	2	1	0	3
Source 1: Met OfficeRoyal Netherlands Meteorological Institute
Source 2: Weather Atlas (percent sunshine and UV Index)CEDA ArchiveTORROTime and Date See Climate of London for additional climate information.

=== Areas ===
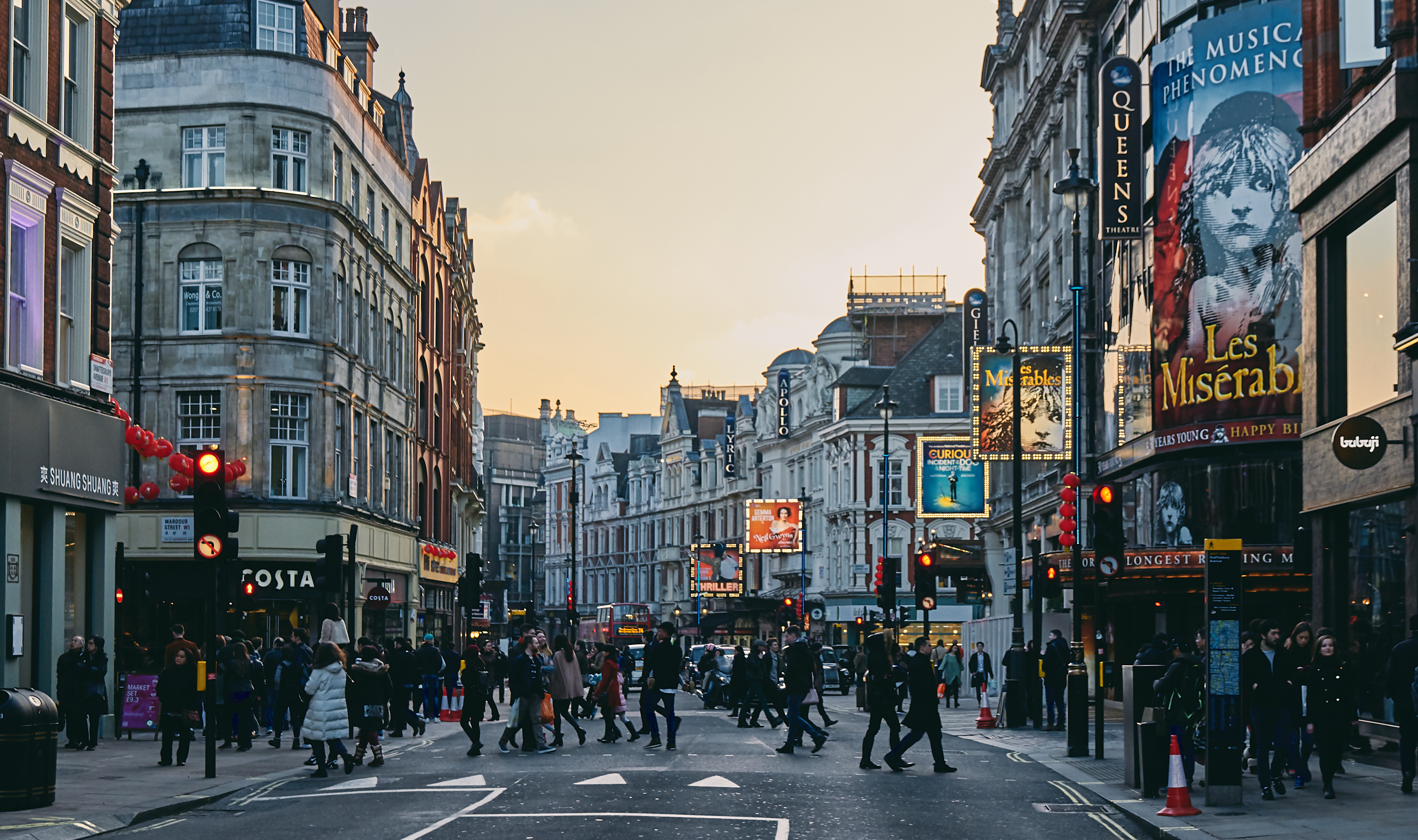
The West End theatre district in 2016

Places within London are identified using area names, such as Mayfair, Southwark, and Whitechapel. These are informal designations, reflect the names of villages that have been absorbed by sprawl, or are superseded administrative units. Since 1965, Greater London has been divided into 32 London boroughs in addition to its once walled ancient core, the City of London. The City of London is the main financial district, and Canary Wharf has developed into a new financial and commercial hub in the Docklands. The West End is an area of inner West London with the main shopping and entertainment areas, including West End theatre, and attracts many tourists. Its residential areas where properties can sell for tens of millions of pounds. The East End is the part of East London closest to the City of London. It has a high immigrant population and is one of the poorest areas of the capital. It once included the main northern part of the Port of London and extensive industry. In the late 20th century, deindustrialisation and the closure of the docks brought hardship. Large redeveloped brownfield areas include London Riverside and the Lower Lea Valley, which was developed into the Olympic Park for the 2012 Olympics.

=== Architecture ===
London's buildings are of many architectural styles and ages. Many grand houses and public buildings, such as the National Gallery, are constructed from Portland stone. Some areas, particularly just west of the centre, are characterised by white stucco or whitewashed buildings. Few structures in central London pre-date the Great Fire of 1666, other than the Tower of London. Further out is the Tudor-period Hampton Court Palace. The 17th-century is represented by Christopher Wren churches alongside neoclassical financial institutions such as the Royal Exchange and the Bank of England, and the 1960s Barbican Estate. The 1939 Battersea Power Station by the river in the south-west is a local landmark, while the St. Pancras and Paddington railway termini exemplify Victorian architecture.

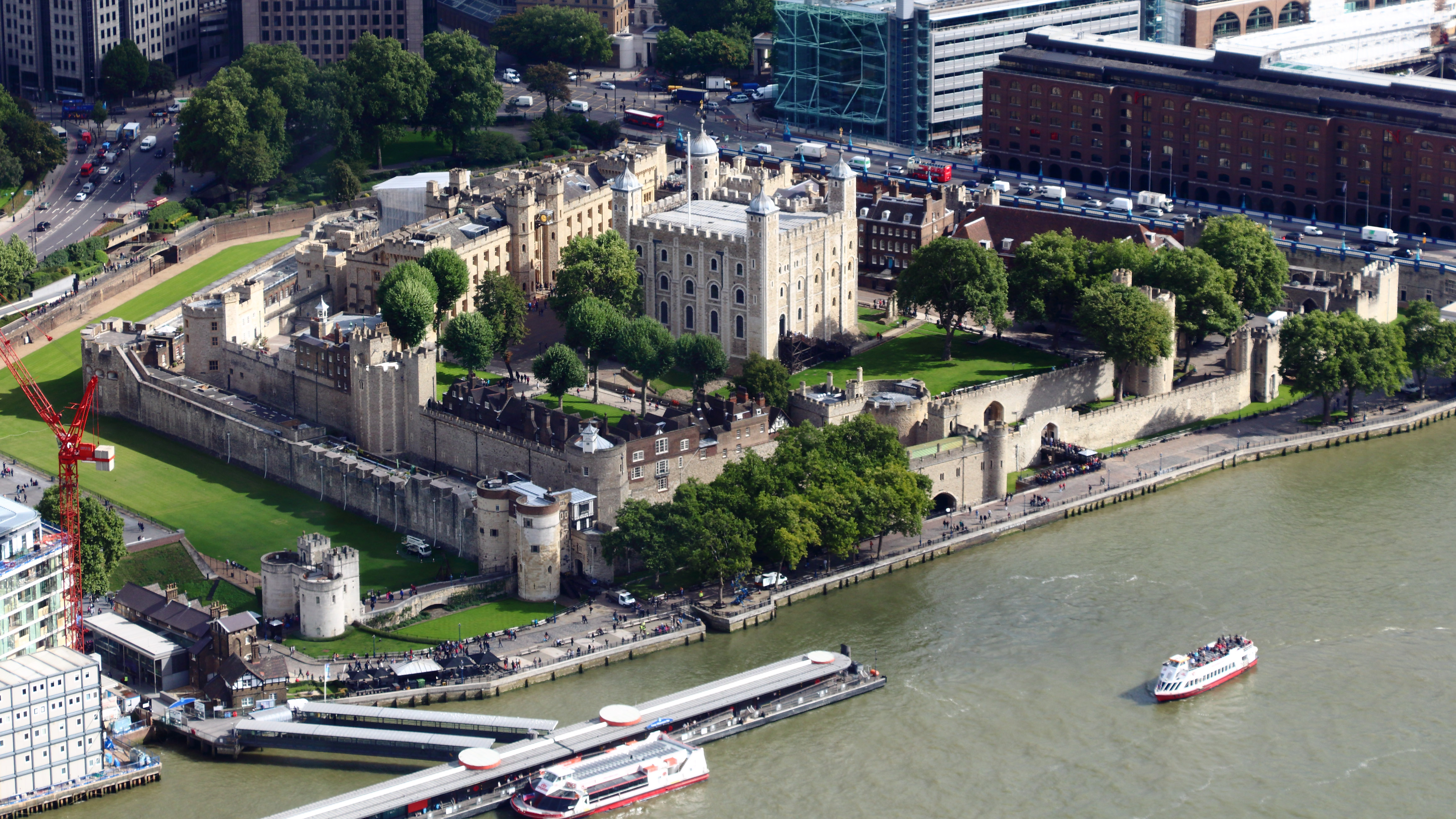
The Tower of London, a medieval castle, dating in part to 1078

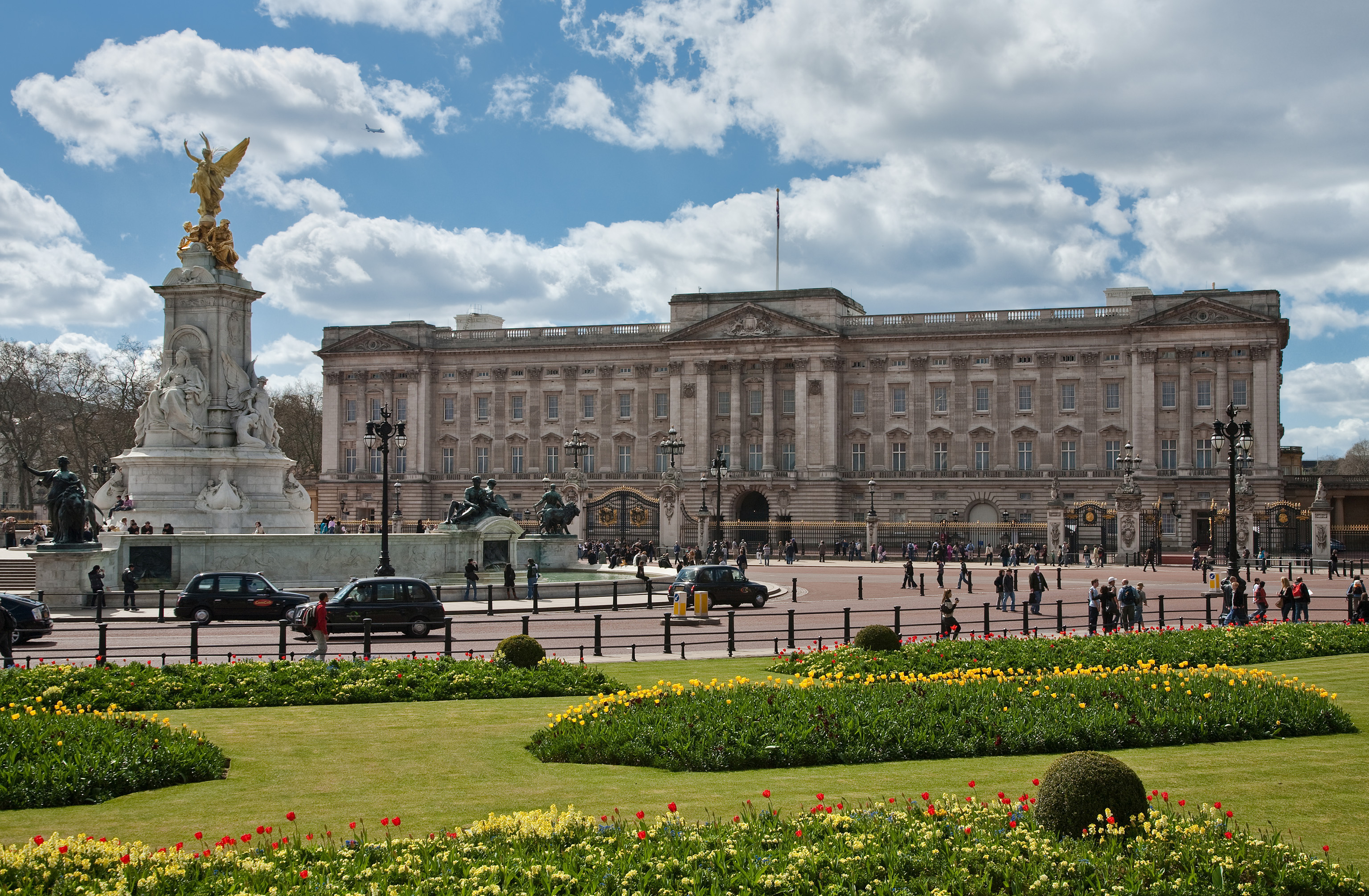
The east wing public façade of Buckingham Palace was built between 1847 and 1850; it was remodelled to its present form in 1913.

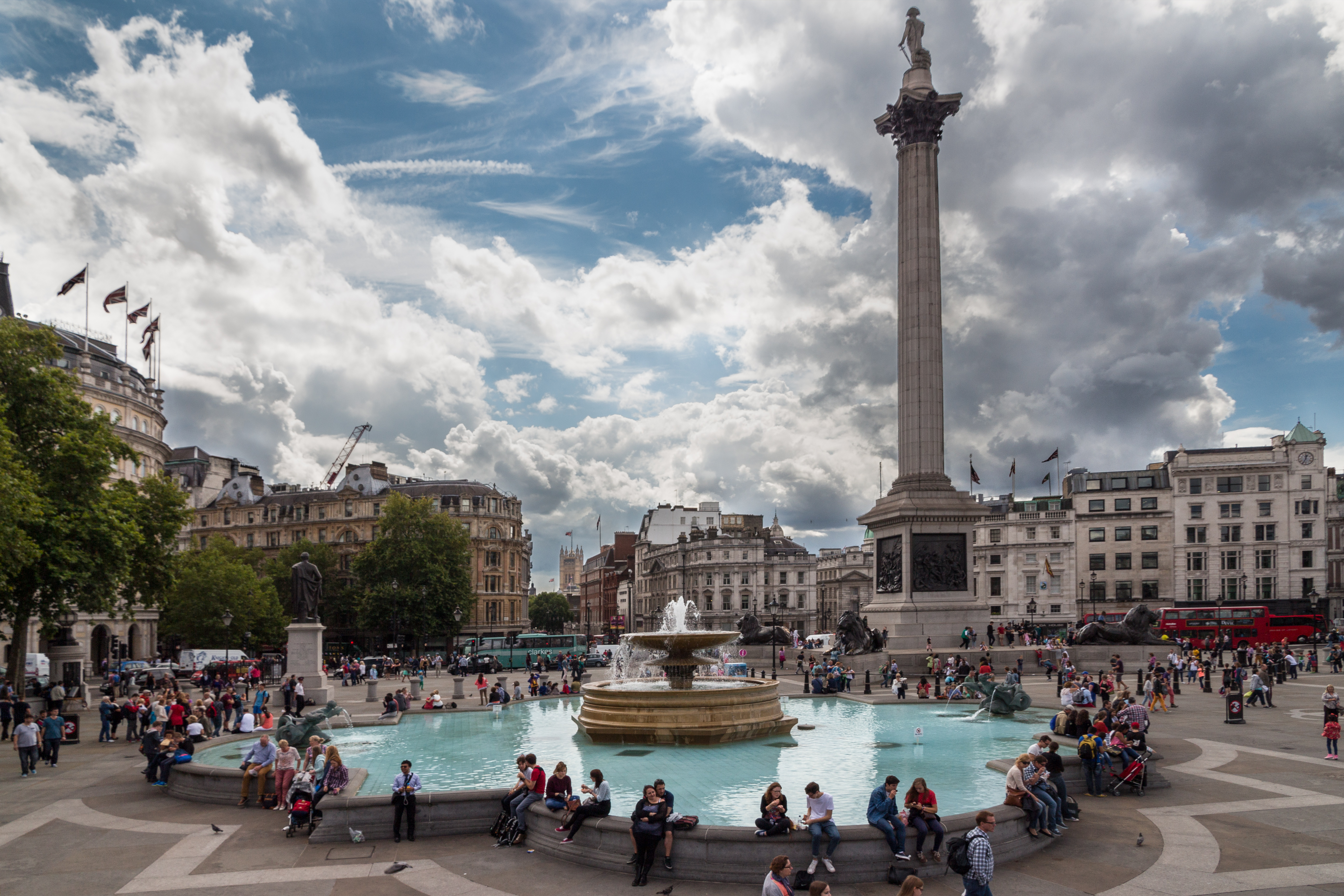
Trafalgar Square and its fountains, with Nelson's Column on the right

The Monument to the Great Fire of London in the City of London provides views of the surrounding area while commemorating the Great Fire of London, which originated nearby. Marble Arch and Wellington Arch, at the north and south ends of Park Lane, have royal connections, as do the Albert Memorial and Royal Albert Hall in Kensington. Nelson's Column in Trafalgar Square is a focal point. Older buildings are mainly brick, commonly the yellow London stock brick.

In the dense areas, most of the concentration is via medium- and high-rise buildings. London's skyscrapers, such as 30 St Mary Axe, Tower 42, the Broadgate Tower and One Canada Square, are mostly in the two financial districts, the City of London and Canary Wharf. High-rise development has been restricted since 1937 if it would obstruct protected views of St Paul's Cathedral. There are skyscrapers in Central London, including the 95-storey Shard London Bridge, the tallest building in the UK and Western Europe. Modern buildings include The Scalpel, 20 Fenchurch Street, the former City Hall in Southwark, the Art Deco BBC Broadcasting House, the Postmodernist British Library near Kings Cross, No 1 Poultry, the BT Tower and The O_{2} Arena.

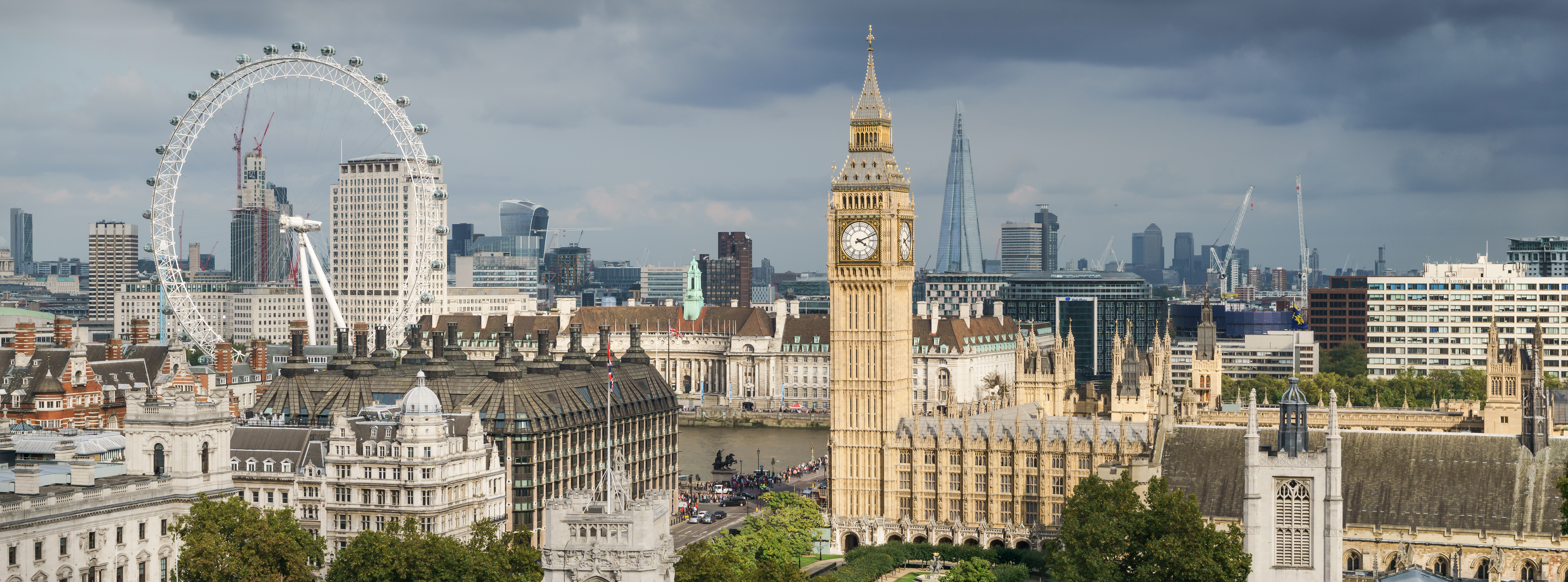
The Houses of Parliament and Elizabeth Tower (Big Ben) on the right foreground, the London Eye on the left foreground and The Shard with Canary Wharf in the background; seen in September 2014

=== Natural history ===
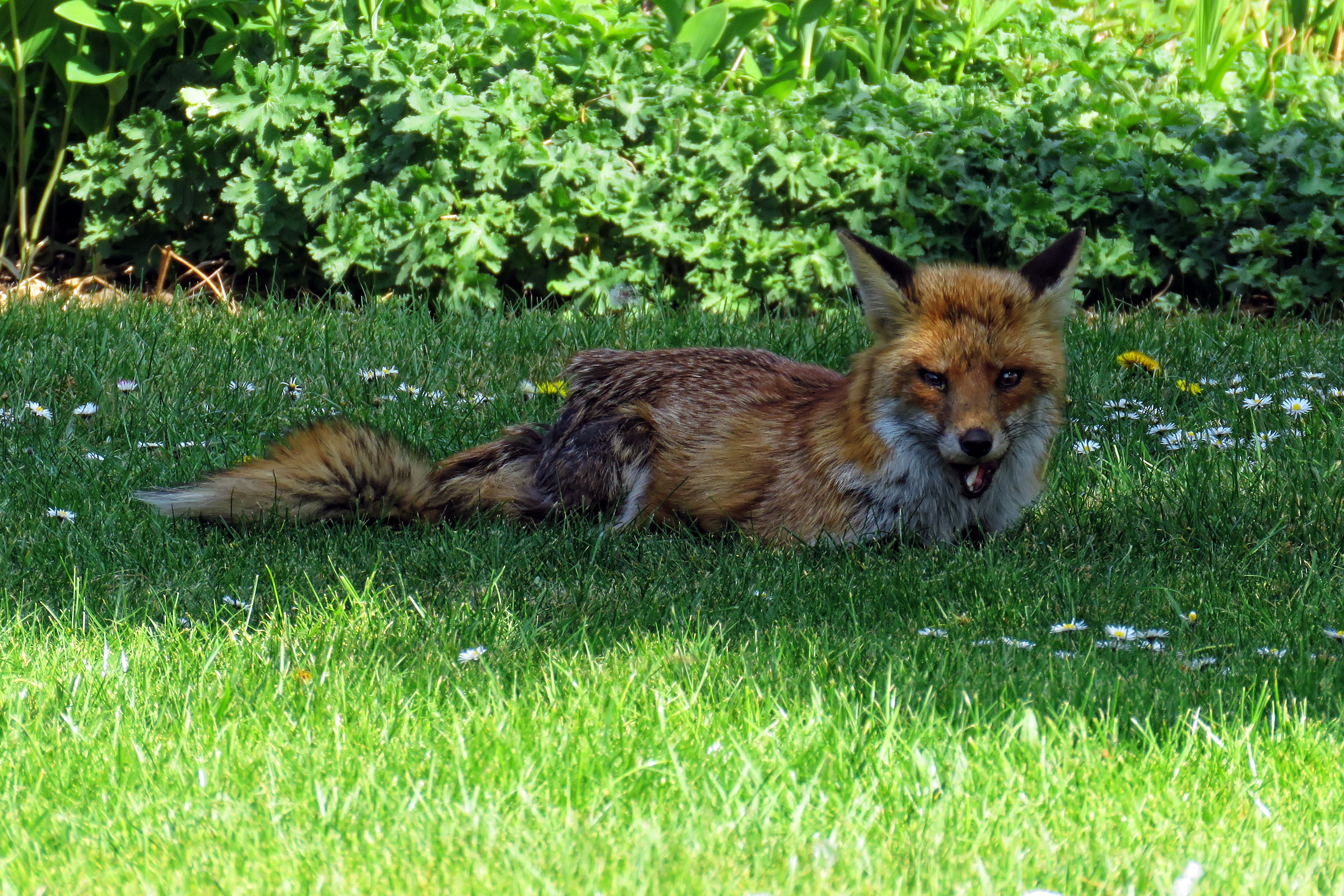
London has some 10,000 red foxes.

The London Natural History Society suggests that London is "one of the World's Greenest Cities" with more than 40% green space or open water, 2000 species of flowering plant, and 120 species of fish. Over 60 species of bird nest in central London, with 47 species of butterfly, 1,173 moths and more than 270 kinds of spider. London's wetland areas support nationally important populations of water birds. In 2024 there were some 3 million pigeons in London. At least six ravens are kept at the Tower of London. London has 38 Sites of Special Scientific Interest (SSSIs), two national nature reserves and 76 local nature reserves.

Amphibians include smooth newts, frogs, toadss palmate newts, and great crested newts. Native reptiles such as slowworms, lizards, grass snakes and adders, are mostly seen only in Outer London.

London has some 10,000 red foxes, as well as hedgehogs, mice, rabbits, shrews, voles and grey squirrels. In wilder areas of Outer London, such as Epping Forest, there are also hare, badger, voles, wood mouse, yellow-necked mouse, mole, shrew and weasel. Otters are starting to return after a hundred years absent from the city. Ten of England's eighteen species of bats have been recorded in Epping Forest.

Herds of red and fallow deer roam in Richmond and Bushy Parks. They are culled each November and February to keep their populations sustainable. Epping Forest is known for its fallow deer, which can be seen in herds to the north of the Forest. A rare population of melanistic, black fallow deer is maintained at the Deer Sanctuary near Theydon Bois, while muntjac are found in the forest. While Londoners are accustomed to birds and foxes sharing the city, urban deer have become a regular feature, and herds of fallow deer come into residential areas at night.

== Demographics ==
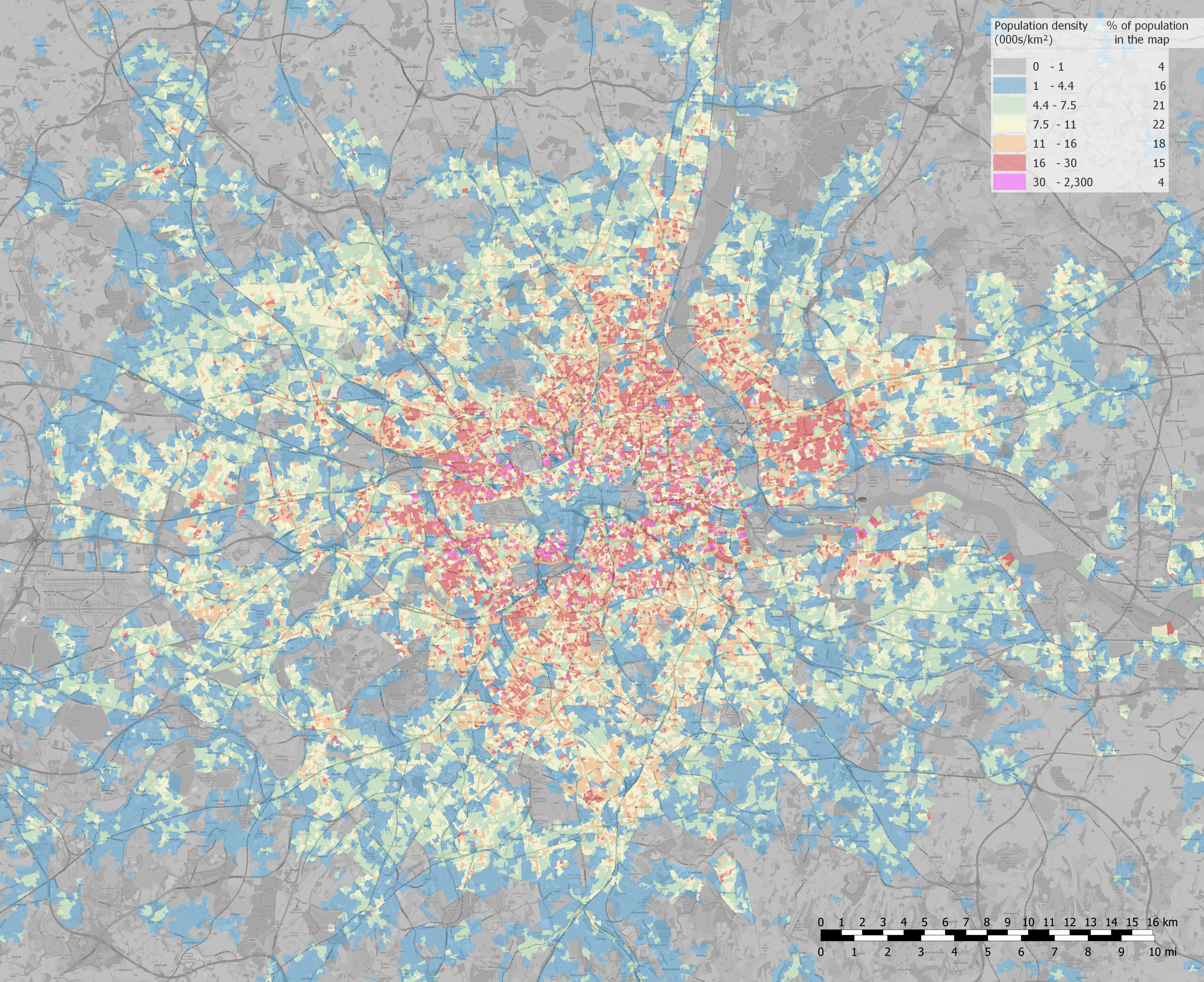
Population density map (%)

London's continuous urban area held 9,787,426 people in 2011, while its metropolitan area held 15.4 million in 2025. A net 726,000 immigrants arrived in the period 1991–2001. The region's 610 square miles (1,579 km^{2}) had a population density of 13,410 inhabitants per square mile (5,177/km^{2}) more than ten times that of any other British region. London's median age in 2018 was 36.5 years old, younger than the UK median of 40.3. In the 2021 census, 3,575,739 people (40.6%) of London's population were foreign-born. About 56.8 per cent of children born in London in 2021 were born to a mother who was born abroad.

=== Ethnicity ===
Maps of Greater London showing percentage distribution of selected ethnic groups according to the 2001-21 Census

White (53.8%, 2021)

Asian (20.8%, 2021)

Black (13.5%, 2021)

The 2021 census reported that 53.8% of the 8,173,941 inhabitants of London were white. 22.2% of Londoners were of Asian or mixed-Asian descent, with 20.8% of full Asian descent and 1.4% of mixed-Asian heritage. Indians accounted for 7.5% of the population, followed by Bangladeshis and Pakistanis at 3.7% and 3.3% respectively. 15.9% of London's population were of black or mixed-black descent. As of 2021, the majority of London's school pupils come from ethnic minority backgrounds, with only 23.9% White British. A 2005 survey claimed that more than 300 languages were spoken in London and more than 50 non-indigenous communities had populations of more than 10,000. At the 2021 census, 78.4% of Londoners spoke English as their first language. The 5 biggest languages outside English were Romanian, Spanish, Polish, Bengali and Portuguese.

=== Religion ===
According to the 2021 Census, the largest religious groupings were Christians (40.66%), followed by those of no religion (20.7%), Muslims (15%), no response (8.5%), Hindus (5.15%), Jews (1.65%), Sikhs (1.64%), Buddhists (1.0%) and other (0.8%). London has traditionally been Christian, with many churches, particularly in the City of London. St Paul's Cathedral in the City and Southwark Cathedral south of the river are Anglican administrative centres, while the Archbishop of Canterbury's main residence is Lambeth Palace. National and royal ceremonies are shared between St Paul's and Westminster Abbey. Westminster Cathedral is the largest Roman Catholic cathedral in England and Wales. There are large Bengali Muslim communities in the eastern boroughs of Tower Hamlets and Newham. Harrow and Brent have large Hindu communities, the latter hosting a large Hindu temple. London is home to 44 Hindu temples. Southall is home to a Sikh community and the Gurdwara Sri Guru Singh Sabha Southall was the largest Sikh temple outside India until Guru Nanak Darbar Gurdwara was built in Kent 2010. Most British Jews live in London, with a particular concentrations in the London Borough of Barnet and the London Borough of Hackney. Opened in 1701, Bevis Marks Synagogue in the City of London is affiliated to London's historic Sephardic Jewish community. It is the oldest continually active synagogue in Europe. Stanmore and Canons Park Synagogue has the largest membership of any Orthodox synagogue in Europe.

=== Accents ===
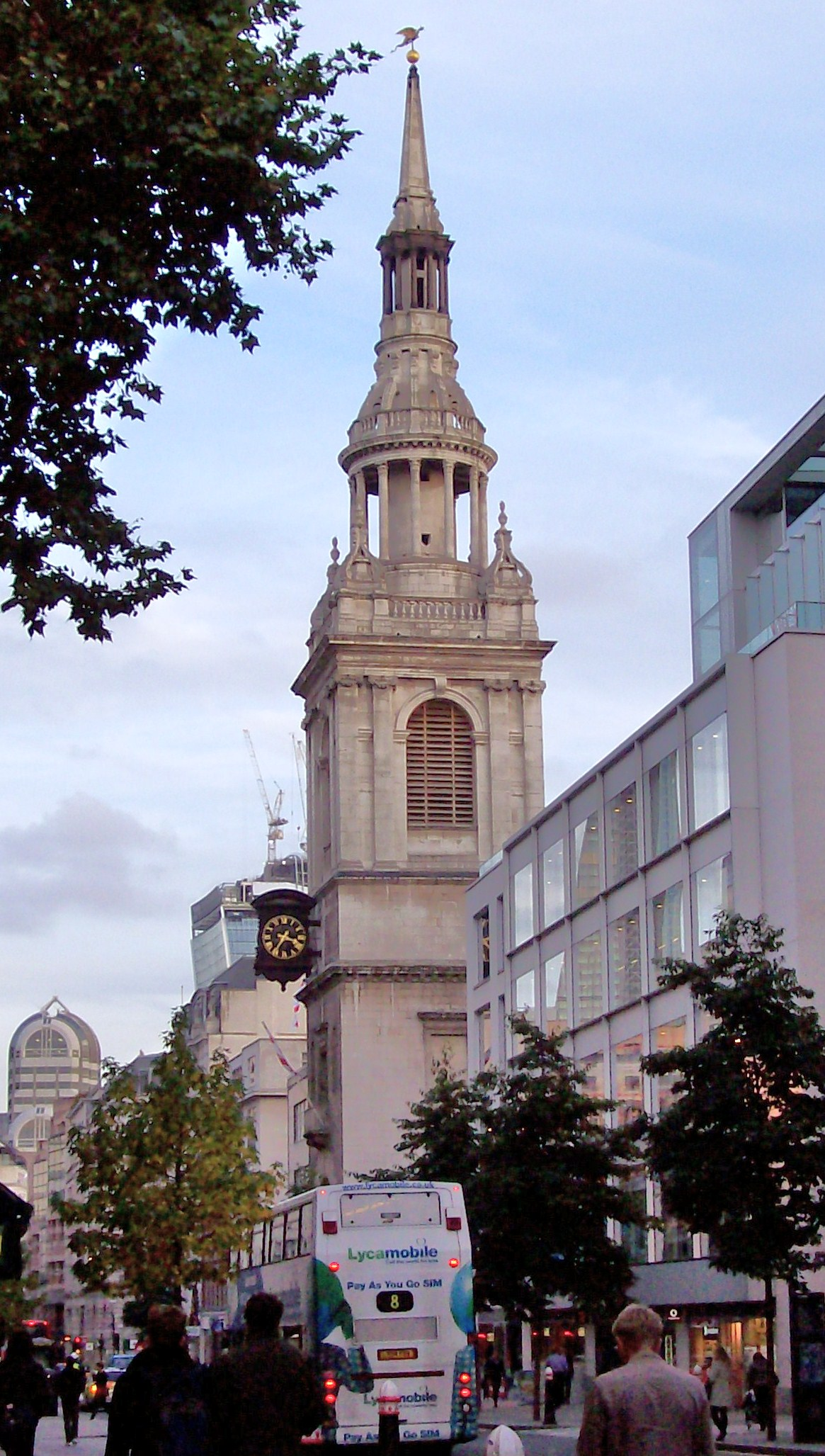
Traditionally, anyone born within earshot of the bells of St Mary-le-Bow church was considered to be a true Cockney.

Cockney is an accent heard across London, mainly spoken by working-class and lower-middle-class people of East London. Estuary English is an intermediate accent between Cockney and Received Pronunciation, widely spoken by people of all classes. Multicultural London English is a multiethnolect in multicultural areas amongst young, working-class people from diverse backgrounds, especially Afro-Caribbean and South Asian, with Cockney influence. Received Pronunciation is the accent regarded as standard for British English. It is mainly spoken by upper-class and upper-middle class Londoners.

== Economy ==
London's gross regional product in 2023 was £617.92 billion (US$846.46 billion) or around a quarter of UK GDP. London has five major business districts: the City, Westminster, Canary Wharf, Camden & Islington, and Lambeth & Southwark. Greater London had 27 million m^{2} of office space in 2001, and the City contains the most space, with 8 million m^{2} of office space. London has some of the highest real estate prices in the world.

=== Finance ===
London's finance industry is based in the City of London and Canary Wharf, the two major business districts. London took over as a major financial centre shortly after 1795 when the Dutch Republic collapsed before the Napoleonic armies. This caused many bankers established in Amsterdam to move to London. London's market-centred system grew more dominant in the 18th century. This economic strength of the city was attributed to its diversity. By the mid-19th century, London was the leading global financial centre; at the end of the century, over half the world's trade was financed in British currency. As of 2023, London ranks second in the world rankings on the Global Financial Centres Index and ranked second in A.T. Kearney's 2018 Global Cities Index.

Finance is London's largest industry; its financial exports make it a large contributor to the UK's balance of payments. It is the world's biggest currency trading centre, accounting for some 37% of the $5.1 trillion average daily volume. The City of London is home to the Bank of England, the London Stock Exchange, and Lloyd's of London insurance market. Over half the UK's top 100 listed companies (the FTSE 100) and over 100 of Europe's 500 largest companies have their headquarters in central London. Over 70% of the FTSE 100 are within London's metropolitan area, and 75% of Fortune 500 companies have offices in London.

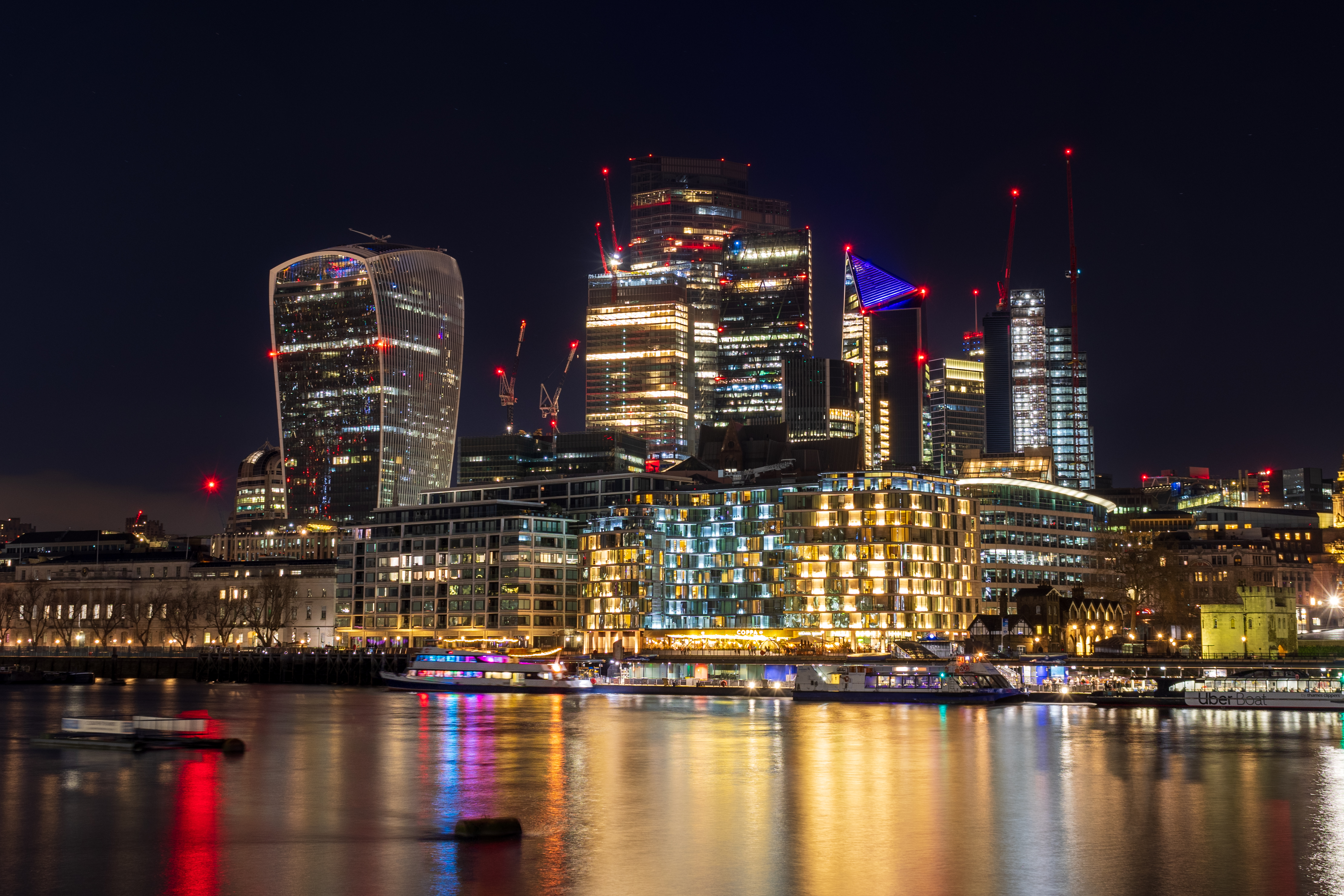
The City of London, one of the largest financial centres in the world

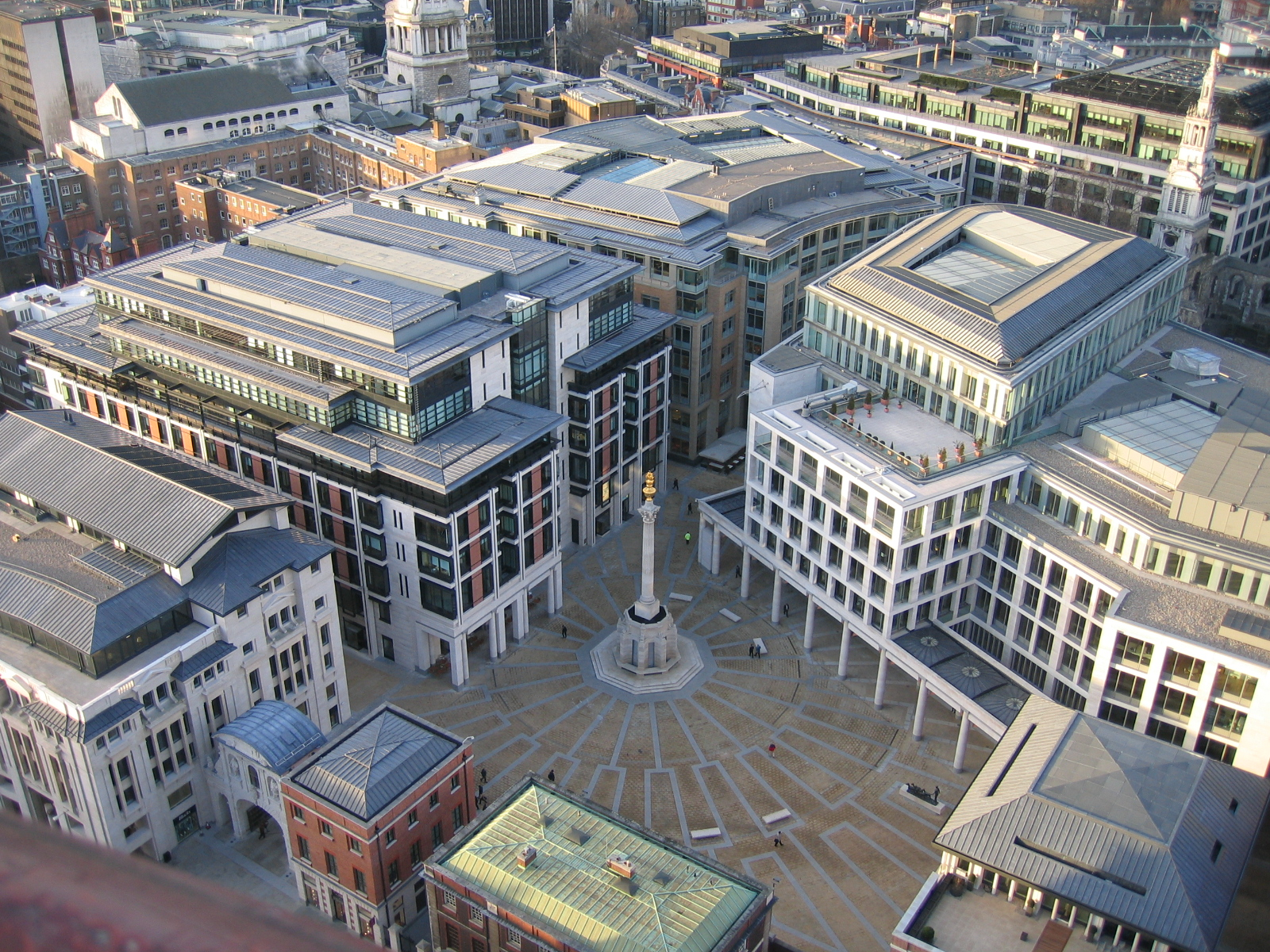
The London Stock Exchange at Paternoster Square and Temple Bar

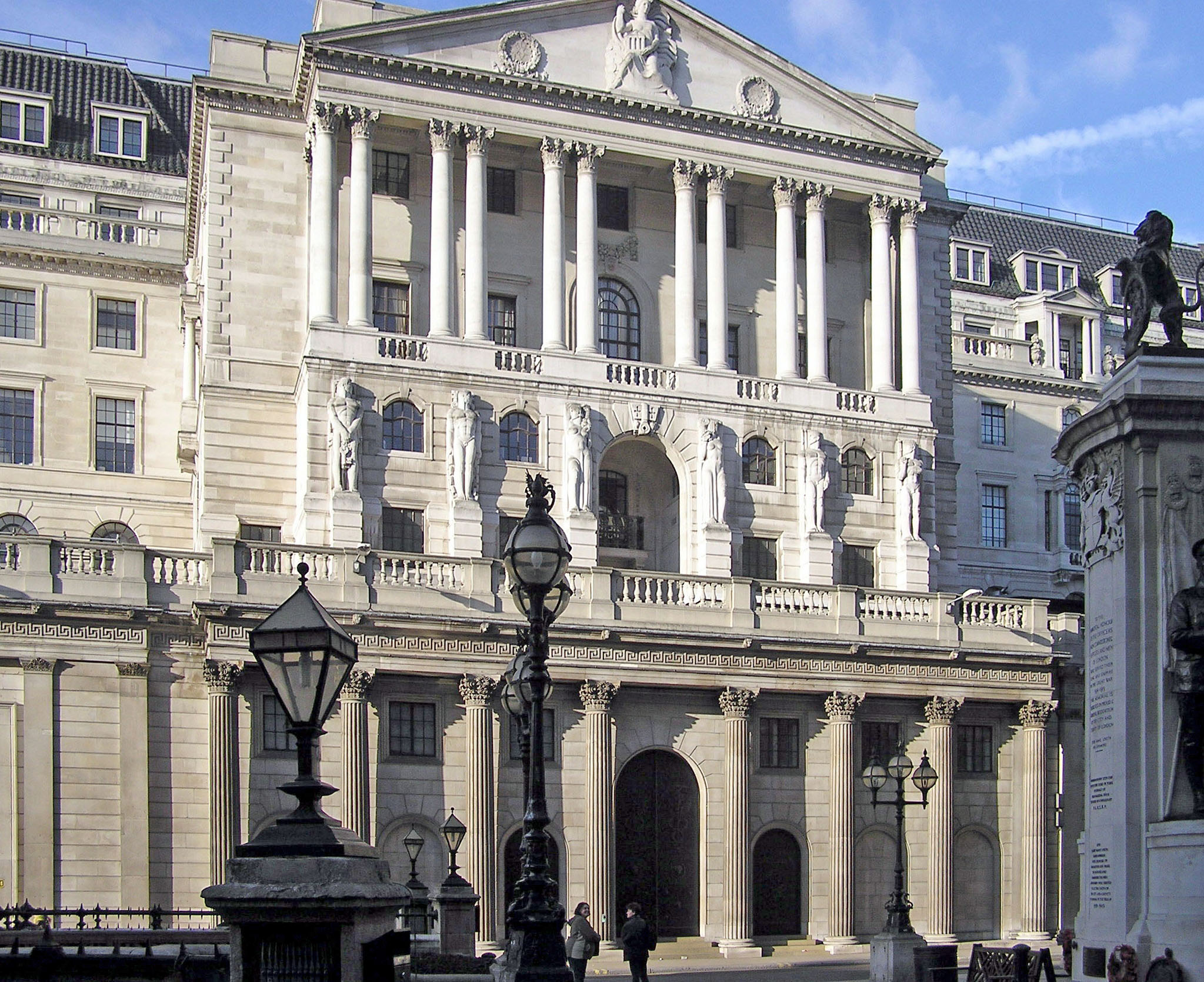
The Bank of England, established in 1694, is the model on which most modern central banks are based.

=== Media and technology ===
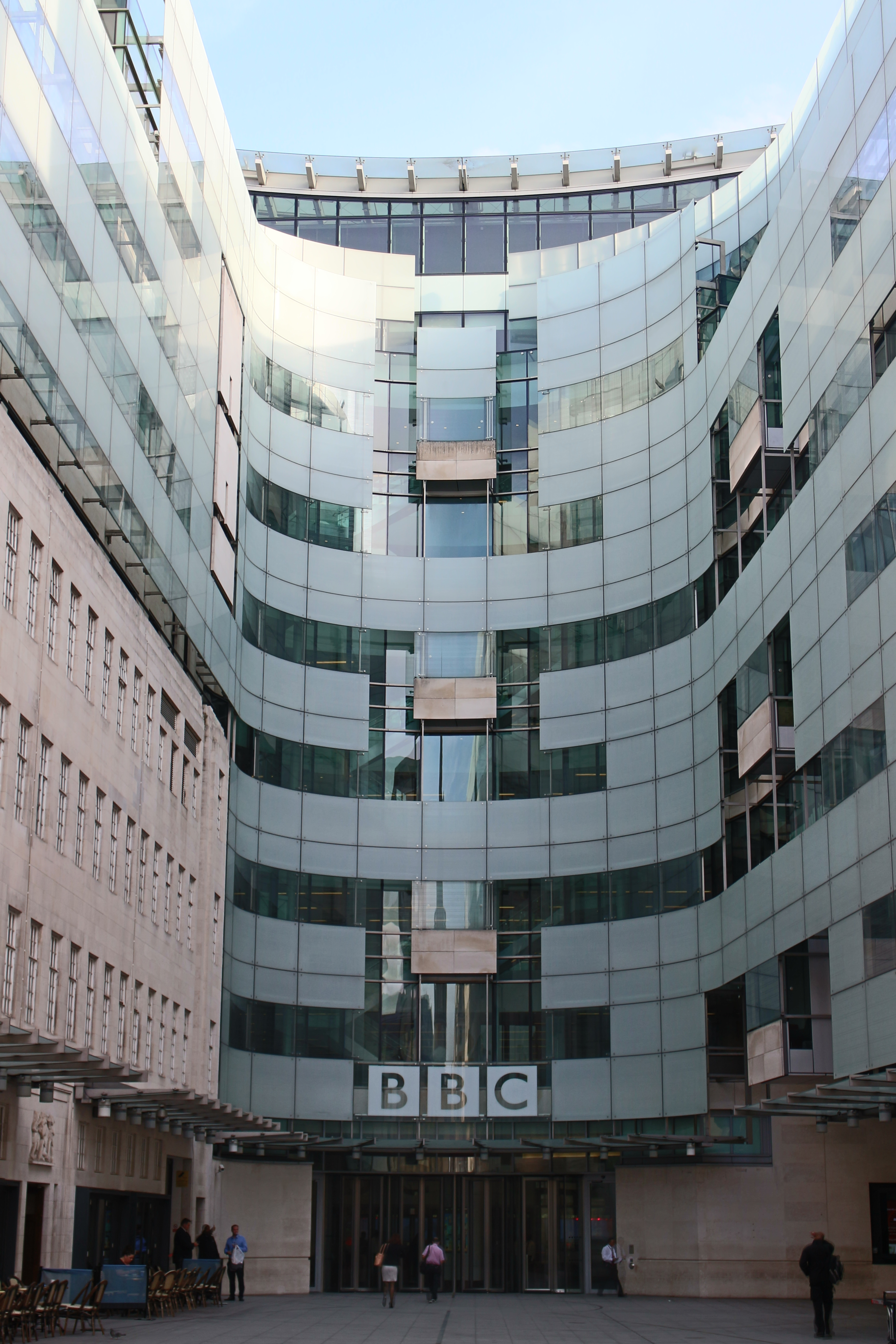
Broadcasting House, headquarters of the BBC

Media companies are concentrated in London, and the media distribution industry is London's second most competitive sector. The BBC, the world's oldest national broadcaster, is a significant employer, while broadcasters including ITV, Channel 4, Channel 5 and Sky have headquarters around the city. Many national newspapers are edited in London; the term Fleet Street (where most national newspapers operated) remains a metonym for the British national press.

A large number of technology companies are based in London, notably in East London Tech City, known as Silicon Roundabout. As of April 2025, London is the 3rd largest game development hub in the world after Los Angeles and San Francisco. The gas and electricity distribution networks of towers, cables and pressure systems that deliver energy to consumers across the city are managed by National Grid plc, SGN and UK Power Networks.

=== Tourism ===
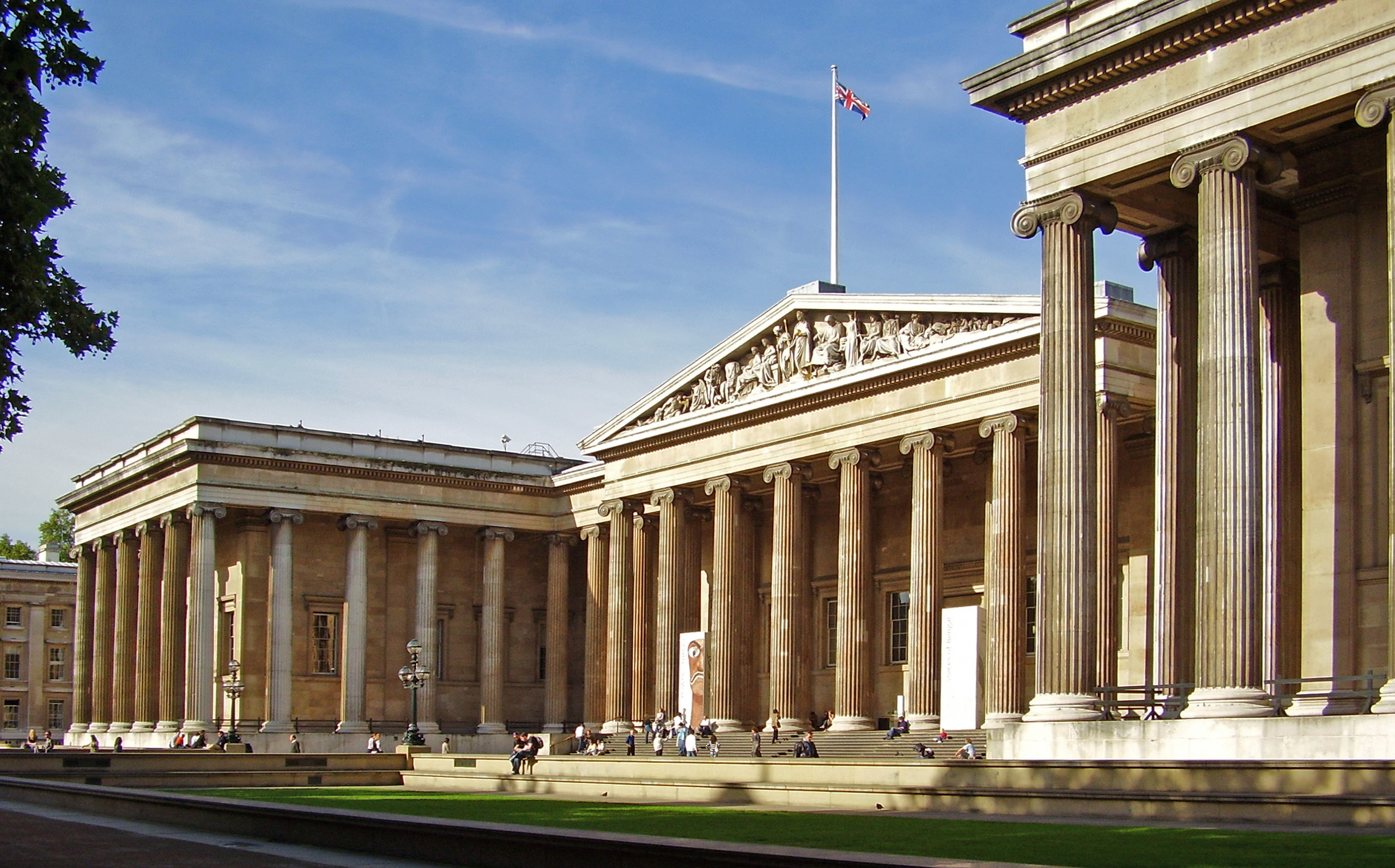
The British Museum

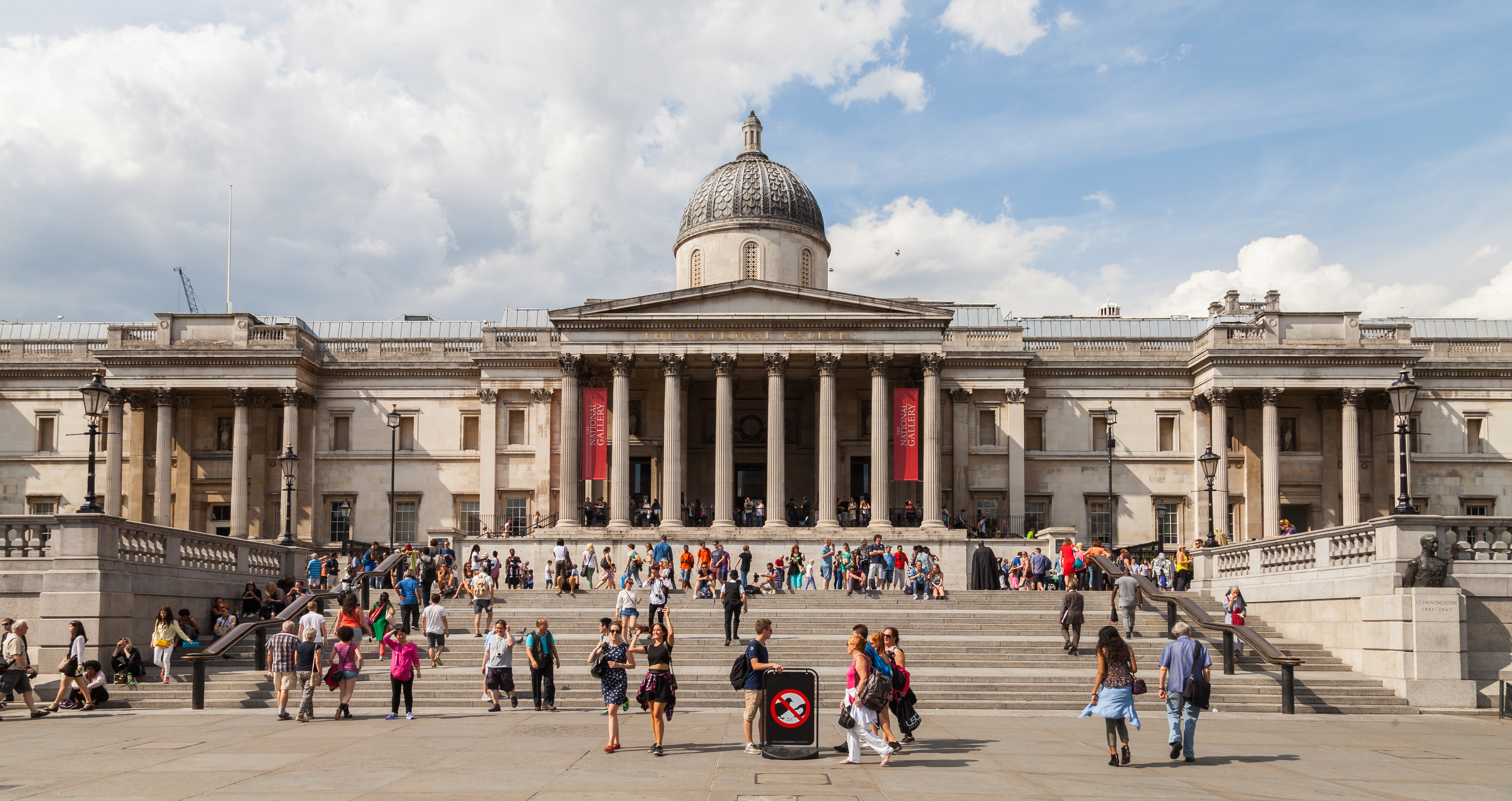
The National Gallery

London is a leading tourist destination. In 2015, it was the top city in the world by visitor cross-border spending, estimated at US$20.23 billion. Tourism is one of London's prime industries, employing 700,000 full-time workers in 2016, and contributes £36 billion a year to the economy. The city accounts for 54% of all inbound visitor spending in the UK.

In 2024, nine of the ten most-visited attractions in the UK were in London. The most visited attraction was the British Museum at 6,479,952 visitors, followed by the Natural History Museum, Windsor Great Park, Tate Modern and the Southbank Centre. The number of hotel rooms in London in 2023 stood at 155,700 and is expected to grow to 183,600 rooms, the most of any city outside China.

== Transport ==
Transport is one of the four main areas of policy administered by the Mayor of London, but the mayor's financial control does not extend to the longer-distance rail network that enters London. In 2007, the Mayor of London assumed responsibility for some local lines, which now form the London Overground network, adding to the existing responsibility for the London Underground, trams and buses. The public transport network is administered by Transport for London (TfL).

The lines that formed the London Underground, as well as trams and buses, became part of an integrated transport system in 1933 when the London Passenger Transport Board or London Transport was created. Transport for London is now the statutory corporation responsible for most aspects of the transport system in Greater London, and is run by a board and a commissioner appointed by the Mayor of London.

=== Aviation ===
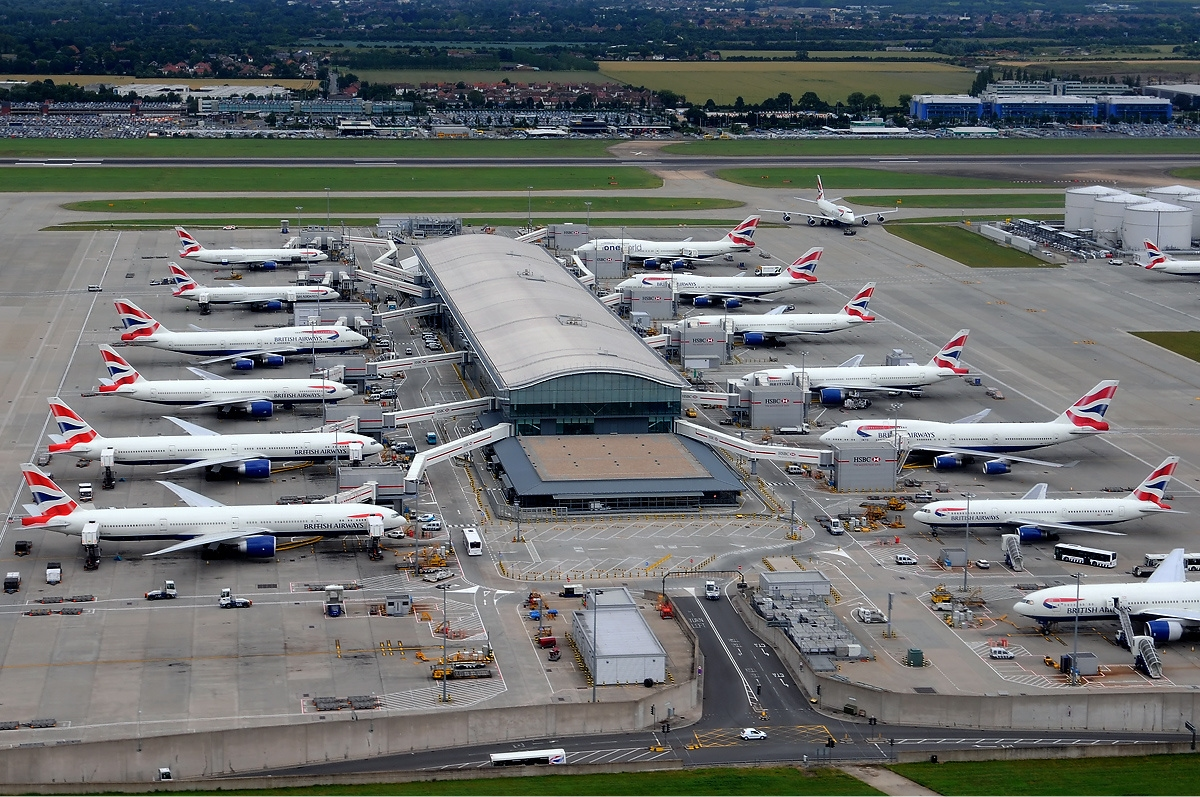
Heathrow Airport is the busiest airport in Europe as well as the second busiest in the world for international passenger traffic (Terminal 5C is pictured).

London is a major international air transport hub with the busiest city airspace in the world. Eight airports use the word London in their name, but most traffic passes through six of these. Additionally, various other airports serve London, catering primarily to general aviation flights.

- Heathrow Airport, in Hillingdon, West London, was for many years the busiest airport in the world for international traffic, and is the major hub of the nation's flag carrier, British Airways. In March 2008 its fifth terminal was opened.
- Gatwick Airport, south of London in West Sussex, handles flights to more destinations than any other UK airport and is the main base of easyJet, the UK's largest airline by number of passengers.
- London Stansted Airport, north-east of London in Essex, has flights that serve the greatest number of European destinations of any UK airport and is the main base of Ryanair, the world's largest international airline by number of international passengers.
- Luton Airport, to the north of London in Bedfordshire, is used by several budget airlines (especially easyJet and Wizz Air) for short-haul flights.
- London City Airport, the most central airport and the one with the shortest runway, in Newham, East London, is focused on business travellers, with a mixture of full-service short-haul scheduled flights and considerable business jet traffic.
- London Southend Airport, east of London in Essex, is a smaller, regional airport that caters to short-haul flights on a limited, though growing, number of airlines. In 2017, international passengers made up over 95% of the total at Southend, the highest proportion of any London airport.

=== Rail ===
Opened in 1863, the London Underground ("the Tube") is the oldest and third-longest metro system in the world. The system serves 272 stations, and was formed from several private companies, including the world's first underground railway, which opened in 1890. Over 4 million journeys are made every day on the Underground network. The Docklands Light Railway, opened in 1987, is a local metro system serving the Docklands and Southeast London.

There are 368 railway stations in the London fare zones on an extensive above-ground suburban railway network, especially in South London. Most rail lines run into the city centre's main stations. London has Britain's busiest station by number of passengers, Waterloo, with over 184 million people annually. Clapham Junction is one of Europe's busiest rail interchanges. The east–west Elizabeth line opened in May 2022. It was Europe's biggest construction project, with a £15 billion projected cost.

70% of National Rail journeys start or end in London. King's Cross station and Euston station, both in London, are the starting points of the East Coast Main Line and the West Coast Main Line. The Flying Scotsman express has operated between London and Edinburgh since 1862. The opening of the Channel Tunnel in 1994 connected London directly to the continental rail network, allowing Eurostar services to begin. Since 2007, high-speed trains link St. Pancras International with European tourist destinations via the High Speed 1 rail link and the Channel Tunnel. The first high-speed domestic trains started in June 2009, linking Kent to London. There are plans for a second high speed line linking London to the Midlands, North West England, and Yorkshire.

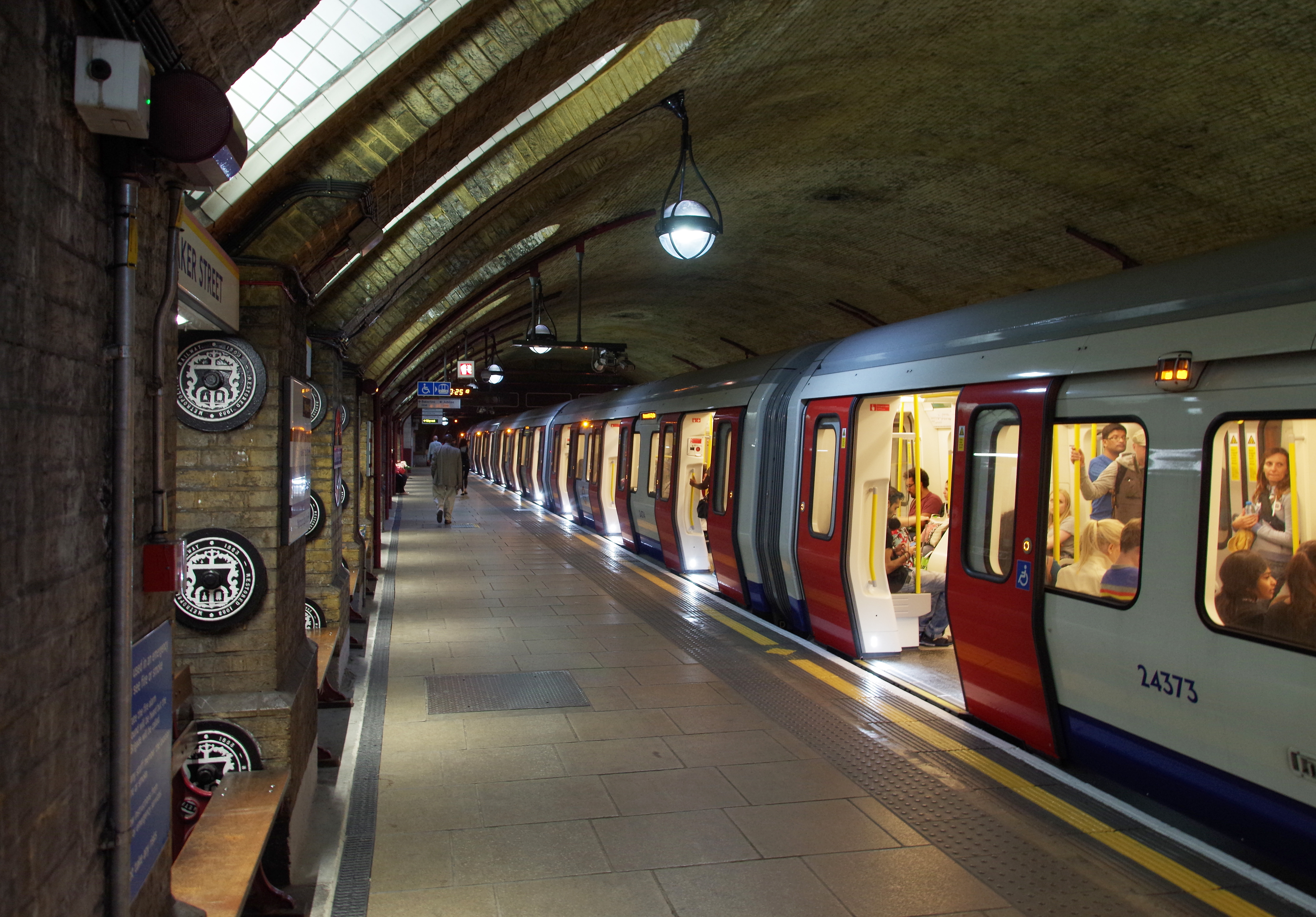
The London Underground, opened in January 1863, is the world's oldest and third-longest rapid transit system.

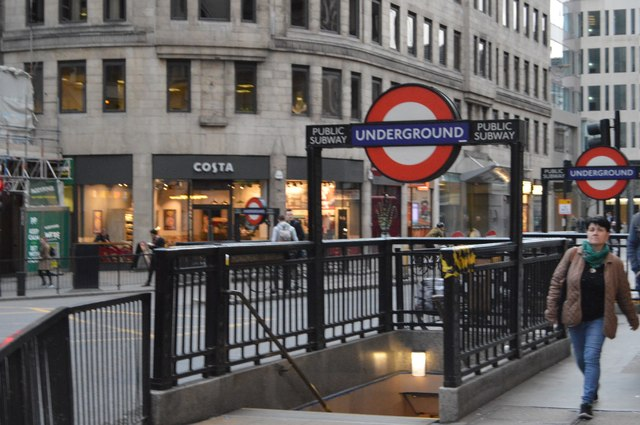
The London Underground's roundel symbol appeared in 1917.

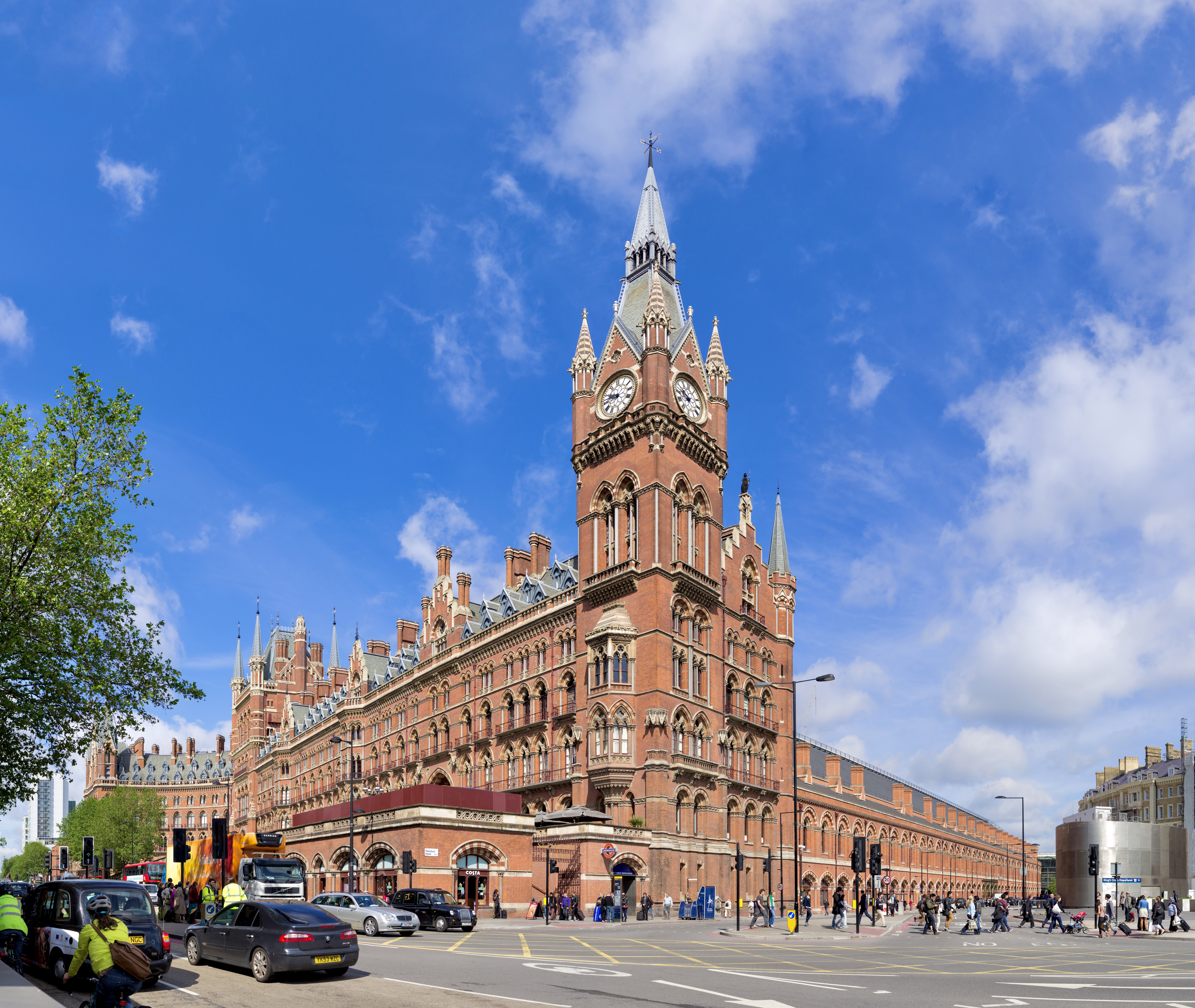
St Pancras International is the main terminal for high-speed Eurostar and High Speed 1 services.

=== Buses, coaches and trams ===
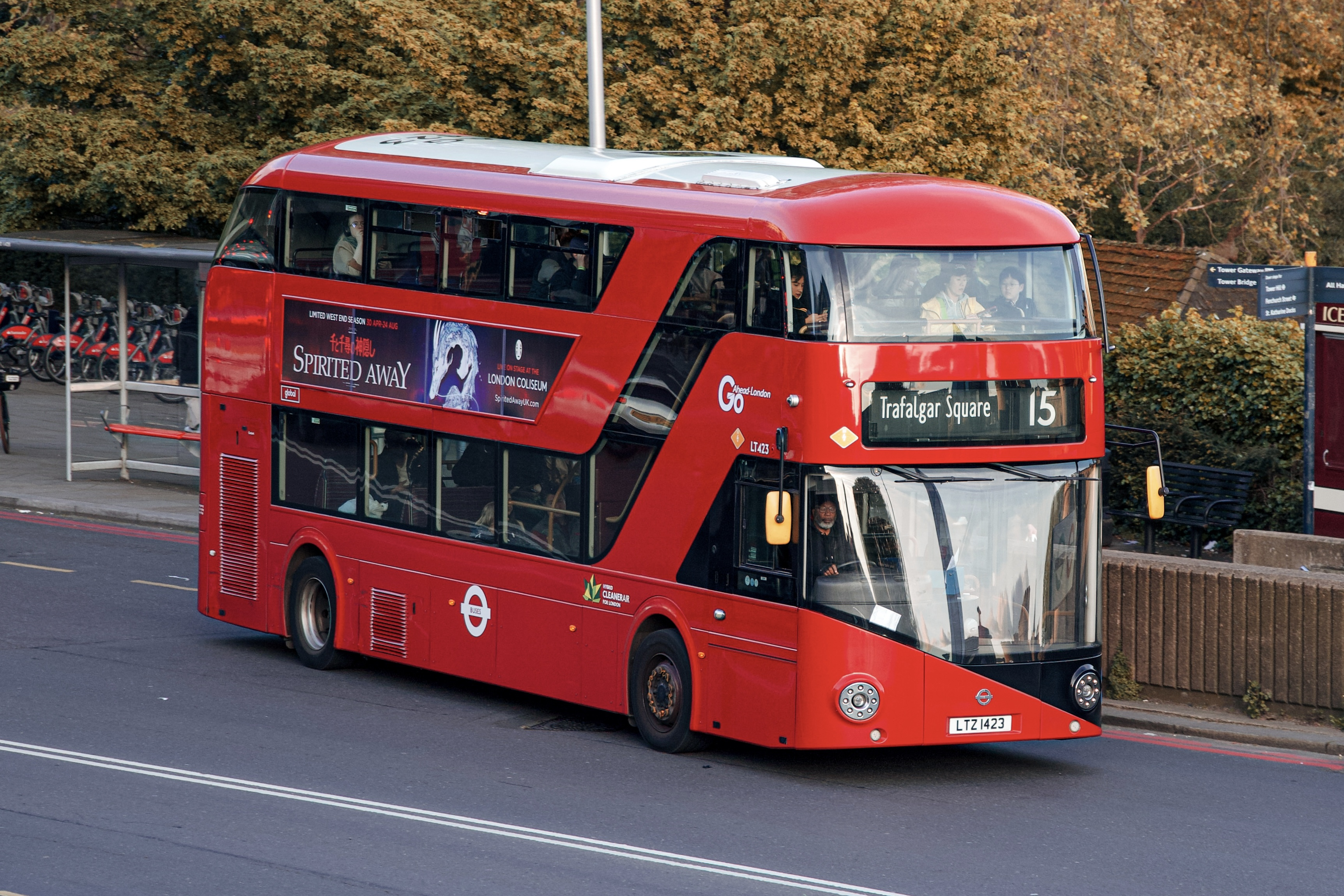
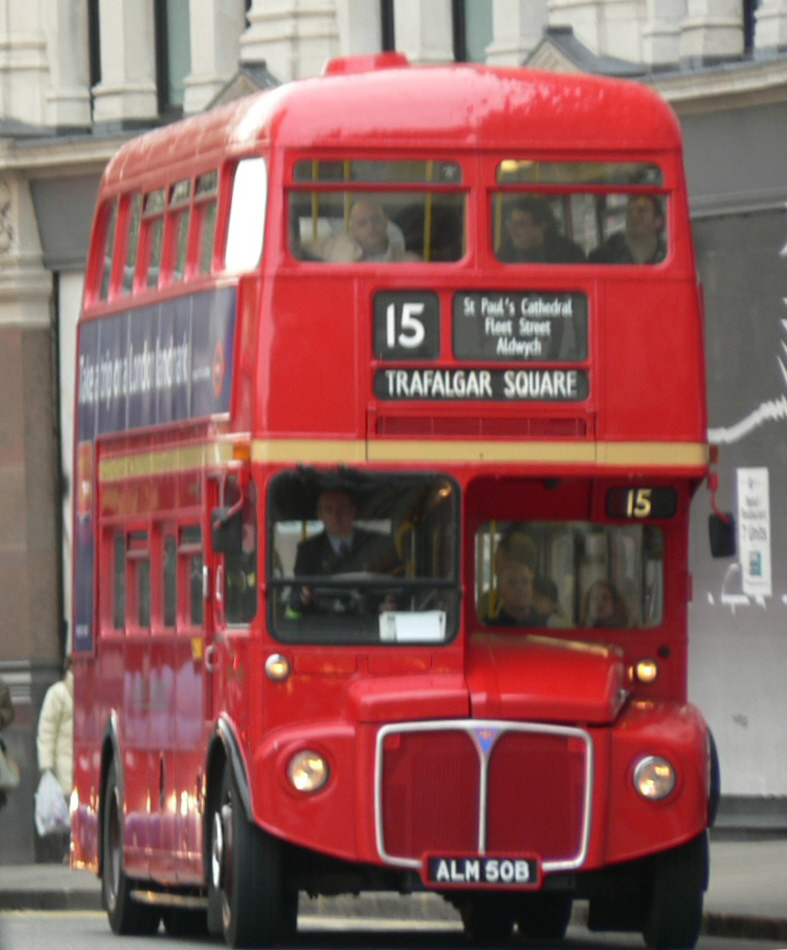
The New Routemaster is the spiritual successor to the AEC Routemaster. First appearing in 1947, the red double-decker bus is an emblematic symbol of London.

London's bus network runs 24 hours a day with about 9,300 vehicles, over 675 bus routes and about 19,000 bus stops. In 2019, the network had over 2 billion commuter trips per year. Since 2010 an average of £1.2 billion is taken in revenue each year. London has one of the largest wheelchair-accessible networks in the world, which, from 2009, became more accessible to hearing and visually impaired passengers as audio-visual announcements were introduced.

An emblem of London, the red double-decker bus first appeared in the city in 1947 with the AEC Regent III RT (predecessor to the AEC Routemaster). London's coach hub is Victoria Coach Station, opened in 1932. Nationalised in 1970 and then purchased by London Transport (now Transport for London), Victoria Coach Station has over 14 million passengers a year and provides services across the UK and continental Europe. A modern tram network, Tramlink, serves South London.

=== Cars ===
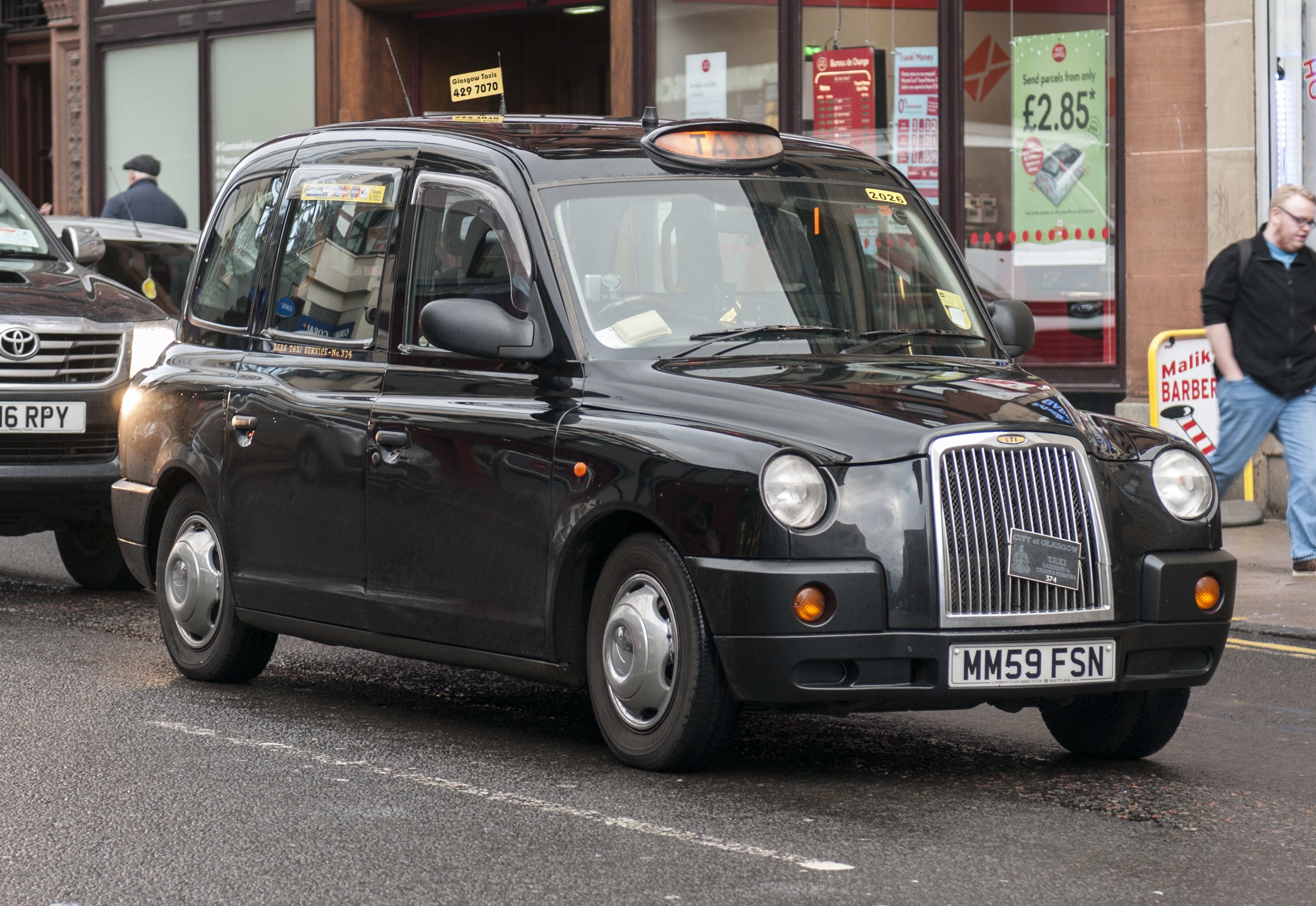
The hackney carriage (black cab) is a common sight on London streets. Black has been its standard colour since the Austin FX3 model in 1948.

Car travel is common in the suburbs. The inner ring road, the North and South Circular roads (just within the suburbs), and the outer orbital motorway (the M25, just outside the built-up area in most places) encircle the city and are intersected by busy radial routes, but few motorways penetrate into inner London. The M25 is the second-longest ring-road motorway in Europe at 117 miles (188 km) long. The A1 and M1 connect London to Leeds, and Newcastle and Edinburgh. The Austin Motor Company began making hackney carriages (London taxis) in 1929; the black cabs have become part of the city's tradition. Although traditionally black, some are painted in other colours or bear advertising.

London is notorious for traffic congestion; in 2009, the average rush hour speed was 10.6 mph (17.1 km/h). In 2003, a congestion charge was introduced to reduce traffic volumes in the city centre. Residents of the defined zone can buy a cheaper season pass. The average number of cars entering the centre of London on a weekday was reduced from 195,000 to 125,000. Zebra crossings, the world's first marked pedestrian crossings, appeared across London in 1951. Low Traffic Neighbourhoods were introduced in 2020.

=== Other modes ===
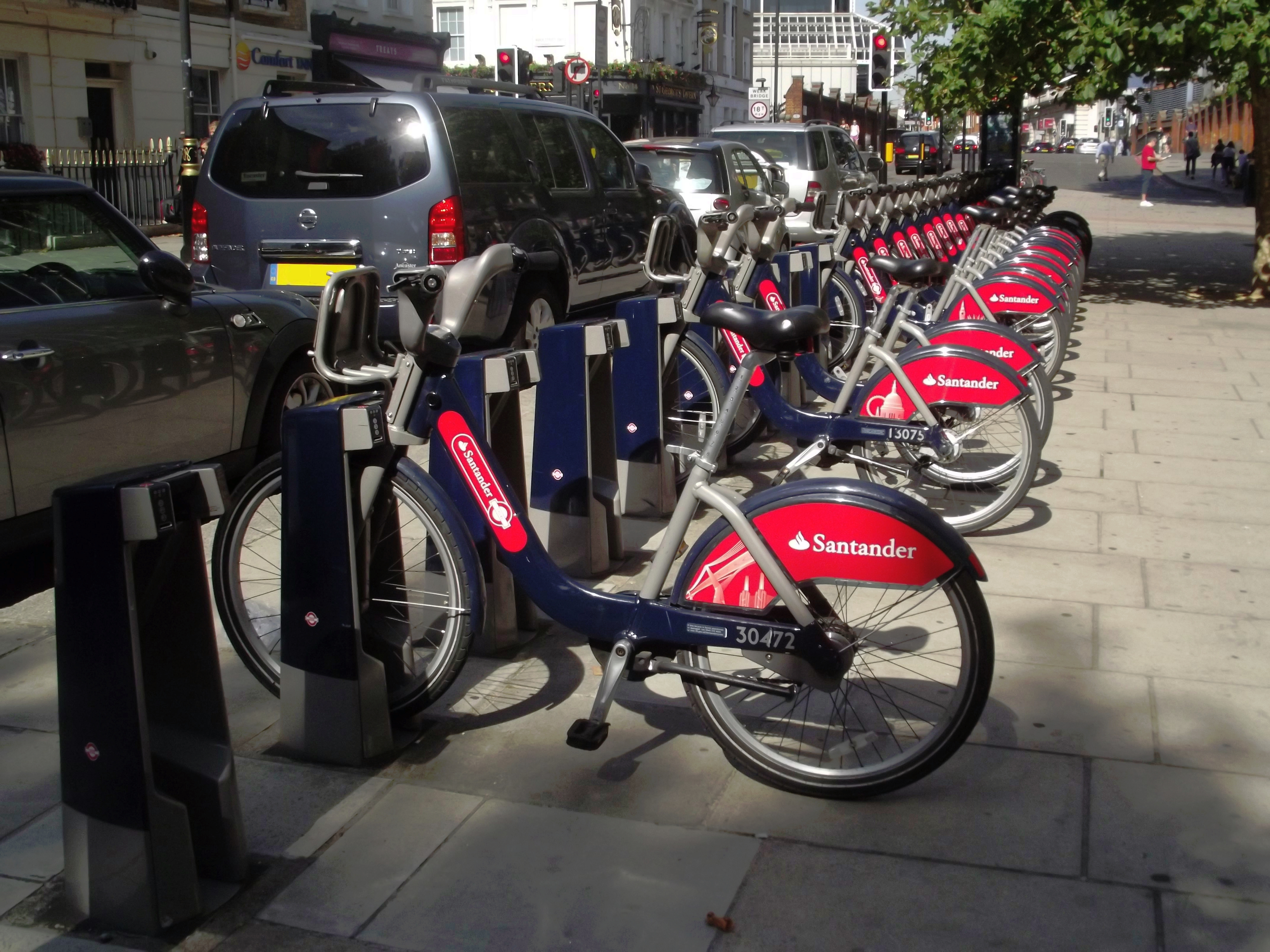
Santander Cycle Hire, near Victoria in Central London

London's only cable car is the London Cable Car, which opened in June 2012. The cable car crosses the Thames and links Greenwich Peninsula with the Royal Docks in the east of the city. It is able to carry up to 2,500 passengers per hour in each direction at peak times. In the Greater London Area, around 670,000 people use a bicycle every day, meaning around 7% of the total population of around 8.8 million use a bike on an average day.

The Port of London, once the largest in the world, is now only the second-largest in the United Kingdom, handling 45 million tonnes of cargo each year as of 2009. Most of this cargo passes through the Port of Tilbury, outside the boundary of Greater London. London has river boat services on the Thames known as Thames Clippers, which offer both commuter and tourist boat services. At major piers including Canary Wharf, London Bridge City, Battersea Power Station and London Eye (Waterloo), services depart at least every 20 minutes during commuter times. The Woolwich Ferry, with 2.5 million passengers every year, is a frequent service linking the North and South Circular Roads.

== Education ==
=== Tertiary education ===
London is a major global centre of higher education, teaching and research and has the largest concentration of higher education institutes in Europe. According to the QS World University Rankings 2015/16, London has the greatest concentration of top class universities in the world and its international student population of around 110,000 is larger than any other city in the world. In the 2022 QS World University Rankings, Imperial College London is ranked No. 6 in the world, University College London (UCL) is ranked 8th, and King's College London (KCL) is ranked 37th. All are regularly ranked highly, with Imperial College being the UK's leading university in the Research Excellence Framework ranking 2021. The London School of Economics has been described as the world's leading social science institution for both teaching and research. The London Business School is one of the world's leading business schools. The city is home to three of the world's top ten performing arts schools (as ranked by the 2020 QS World University Rankings): the Royal College of Music (ranking 2nd in the world), the Royal Academy of Music (ranking 4th) and the Guildhall School of Music and Drama (ranking 6th).

With students in London and around 48,000 in University of London Worldwide, the federal University of London is the largest contact teaching university in the UK. London has multiple universities outside the University of London system.

London is home to five major medical schools and many affiliated teaching hospitals. It is a major centre for biomedical research, and three of the UK's eight academic health science centres are based in the city. Many biomedical and biotechnology spin out companies from these research institutions are based around the city, most prominently in White City. Founded by Florence Nightingale at St Thomas' Hospital in 1860, the first nursing school is now part of King's College London.

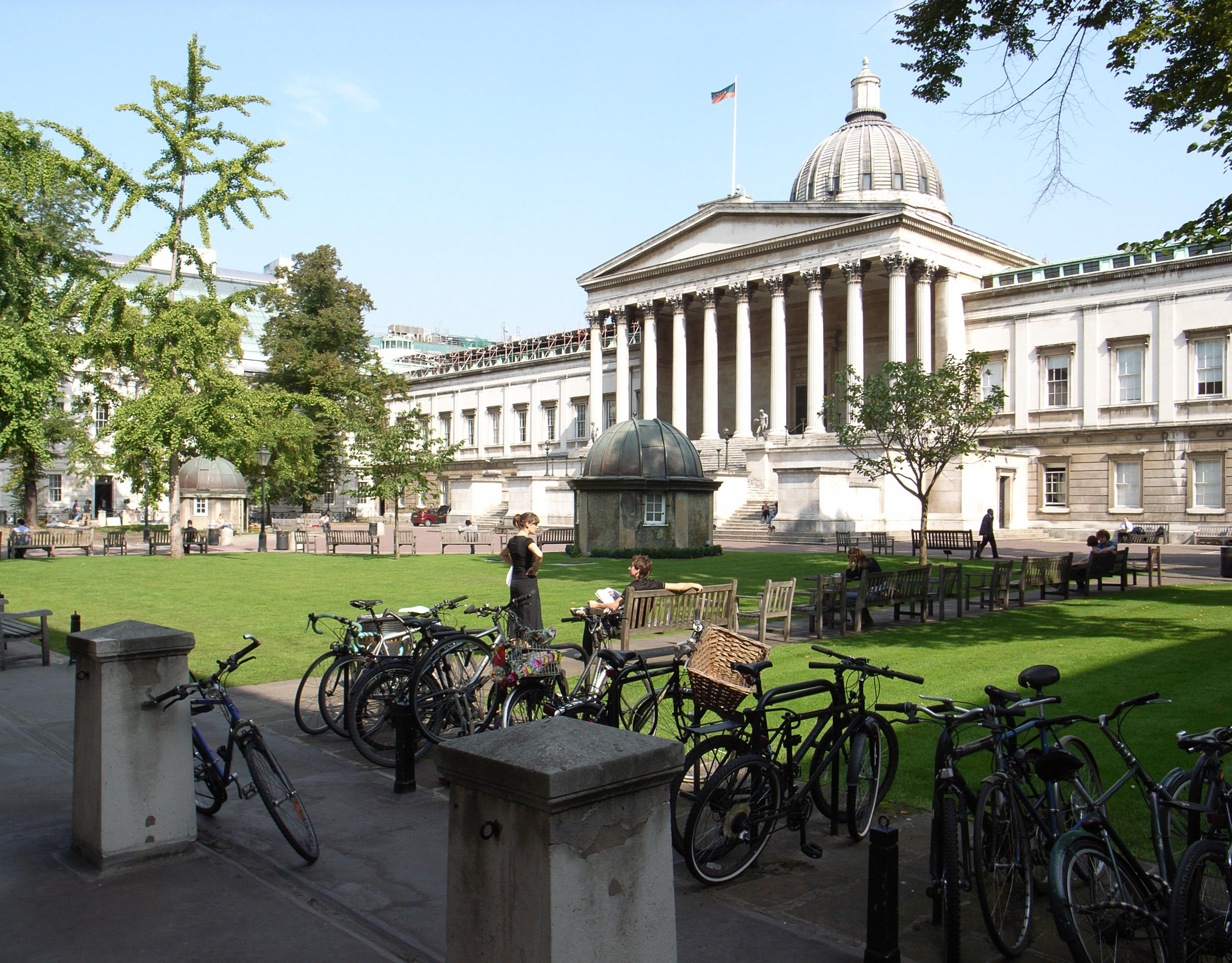
University College London (UCL) was established by Royal Charter in 1836.

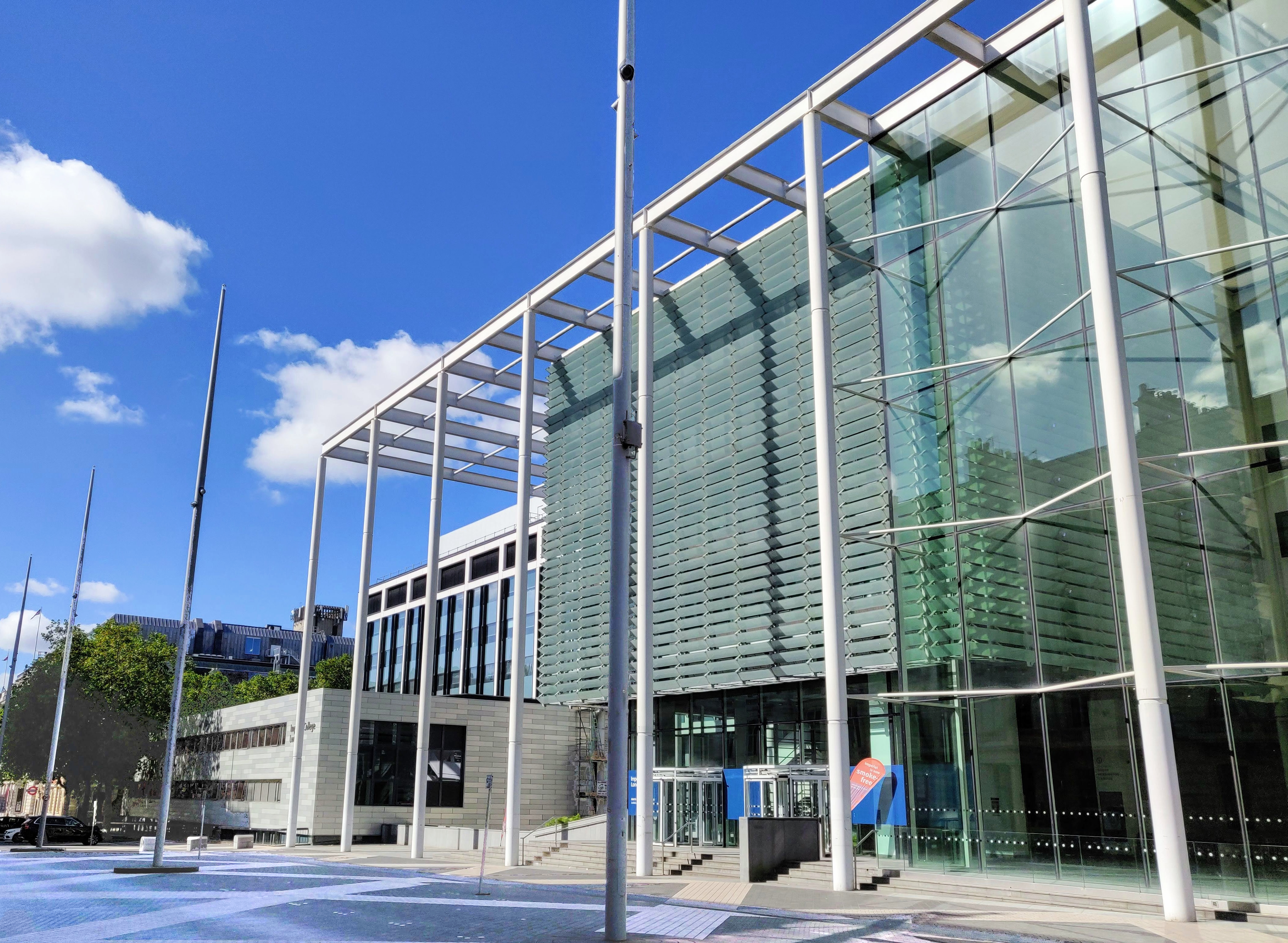
Imperial College London, a technical research university

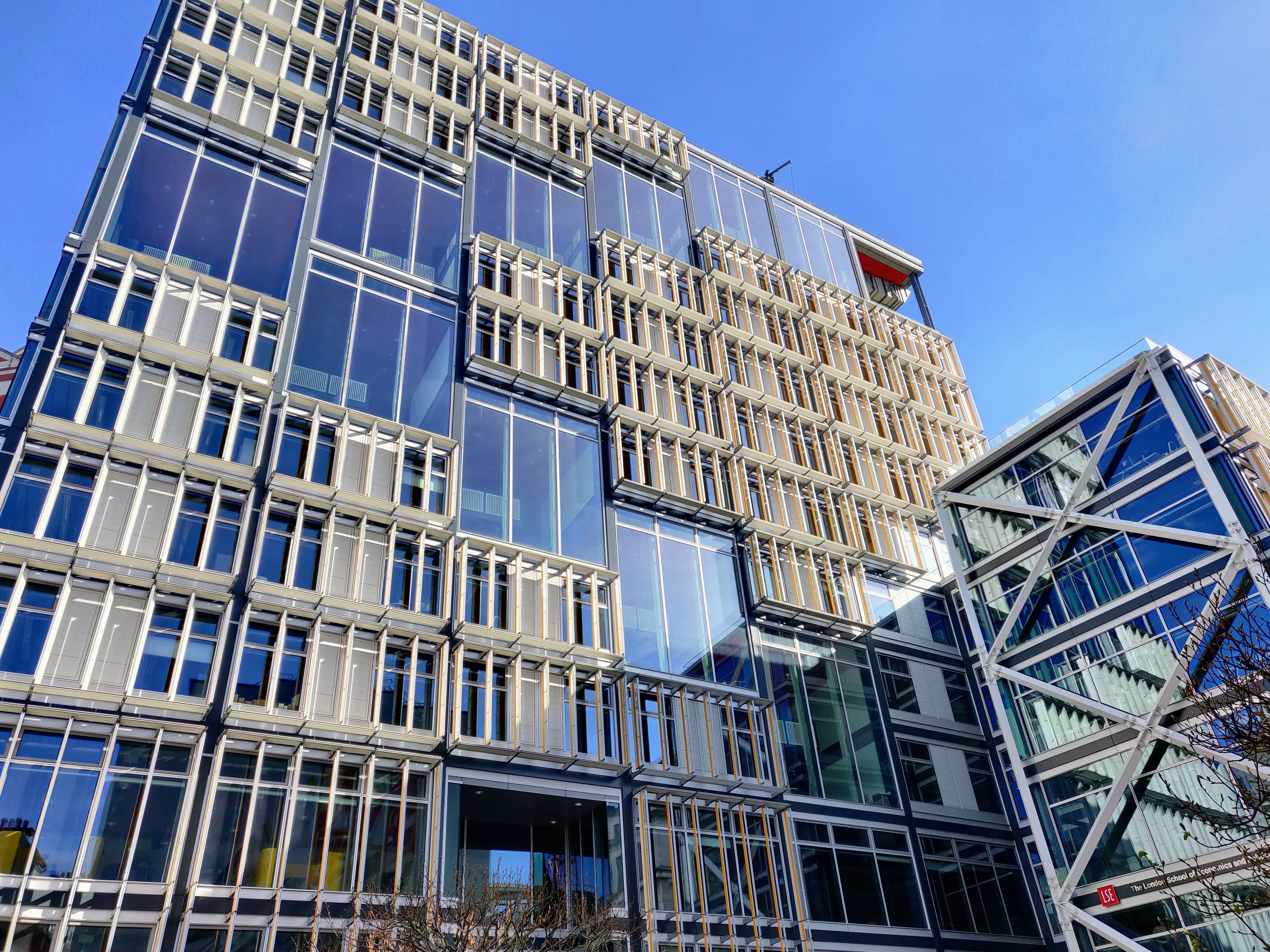
The London School of Economics was established in 1895.

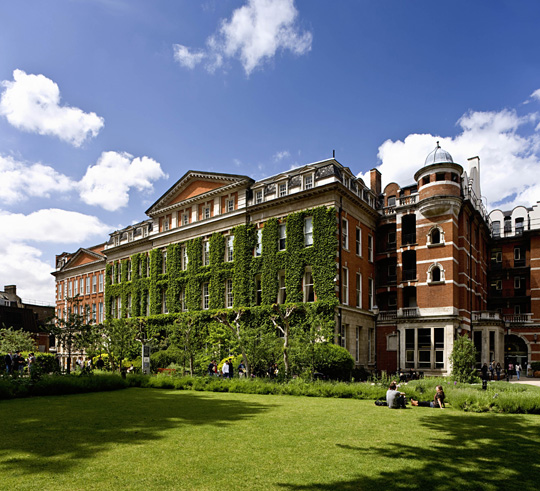
King's College London's Guy's Campus, home to its faculty of medicine

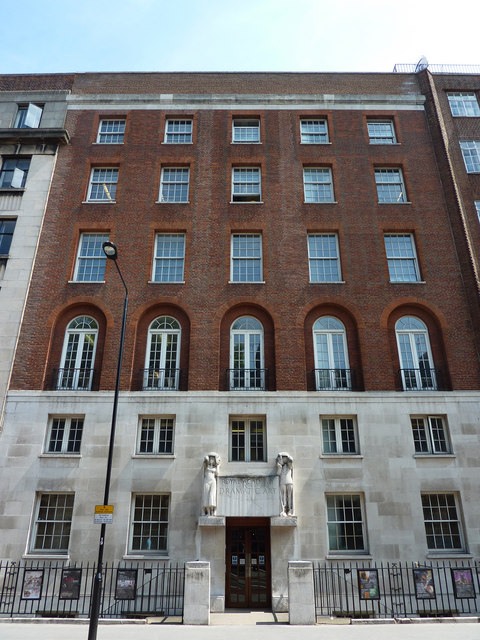
RADA (Royal Academy of Dramatic Art) opened in 1904.

=== Primary and secondary education ===
The majority of primary and secondary schools and further-education colleges in London are controlled by the London boroughs or otherwise state-funded. Private schools and colleges in London include City of London School, Harrow, St Paul's School, University College School, The John Lyon School, Highgate School and Westminster School.

=== Royal Observatory, Greenwich and learned societies ===
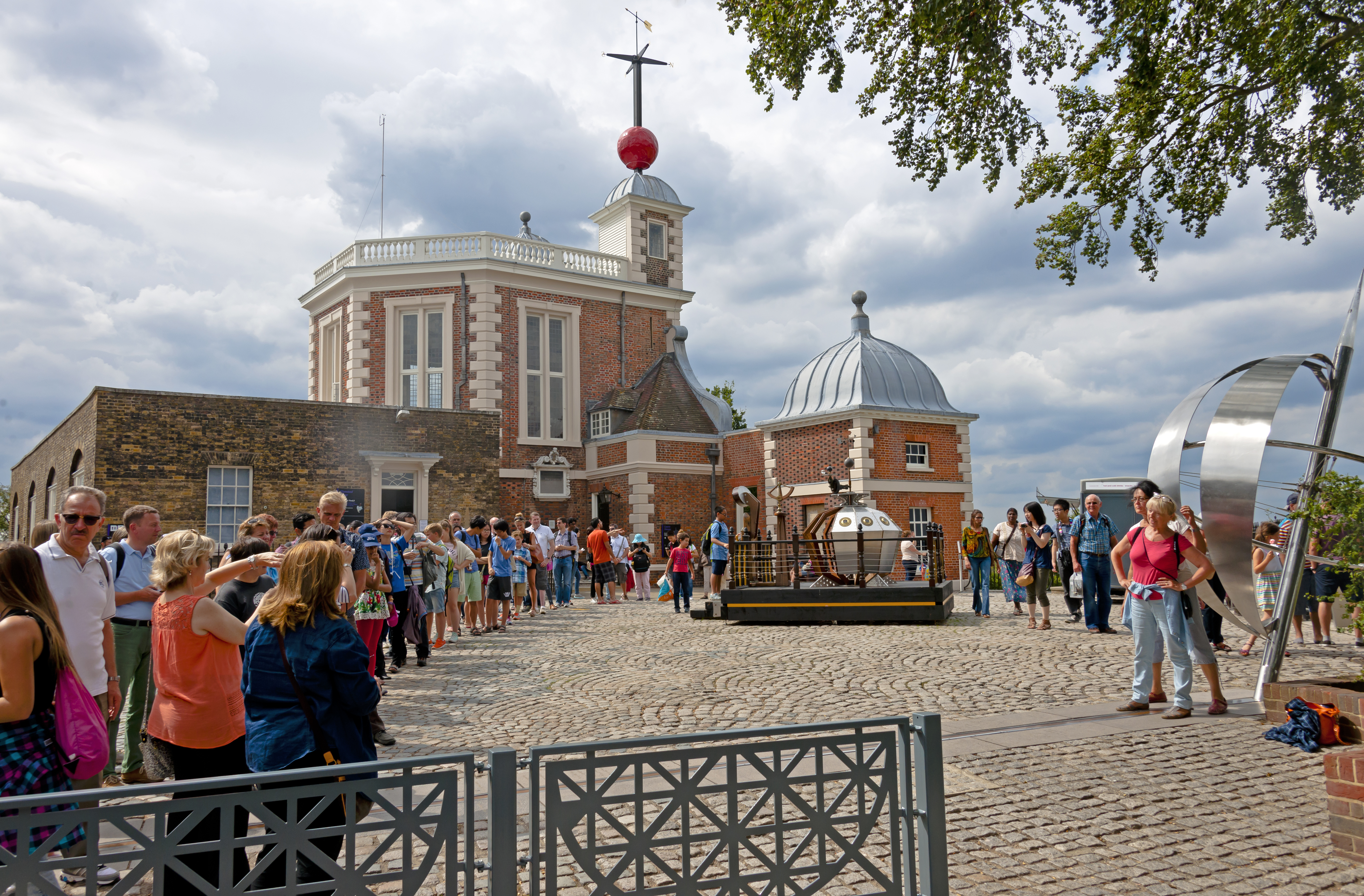
Tourists queuing to take pictures on the line of the historic prime meridian at the Royal Observatory, Greenwich

Founded in 1675, the Royal Observatory, Greenwich was established to address the problem of calculating longitude for navigation. This work featured in astronomer royal Nevil Maskelyne's Nautical Almanac which made the Greenwich meridian the universal reference point, leading to the international adoption of Greenwich as the prime meridian (0° longitude) in 1884.

Scientific learned societies based in London include the Royal Society - the UK's national academy of sciences and the oldest national scientific institution in the world - founded in 1660. Since 1825, scientists have presented their subjects to a general audience at the Royal Institution Christmas Lectures. Other learned societies in include the Royal Society of Arts, the Royal Statistical Society and the Society of Antiquaries of London.

== Culture ==
=== Leisure and entertainment ===
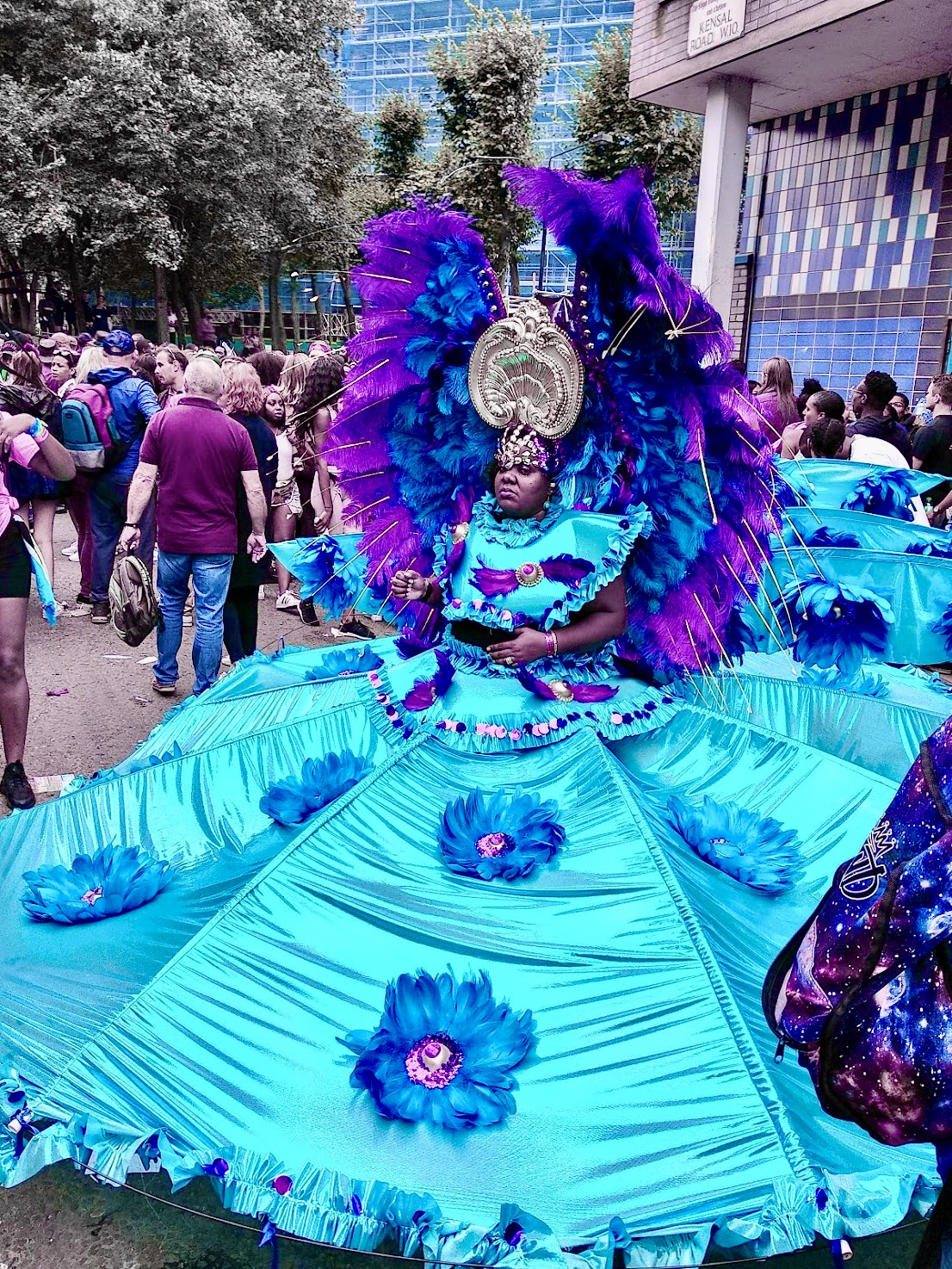
A scene of the annual Notting Hill Carnival, 2014

According to a 2003 report, London has a quarter of the UK's leisure economy. The city is one of the four fashion capitals of the world, is the world's third-busiest film production centre, presents more live comedy than any other city, and has the biggest theatre audience of any city in the world. Alongside New York, London has been described as the cultural capital of the world.

The entertainment district of the West End has its focus around Leicester Square for film premieres, and Piccadilly Circus, with its giant electronic advertisements. It contains London's theatre district and Chinatown district. Agatha Christie's The Mousetrap, the world's longest-running play, has performed in the West End since 1952. Opera and ballet are performed at the Royal Opera House, the London Coliseum, Sadler's Wells Theatre and the Royal Albert Hall. London was the centre of music halls such as the Hackney Empire.

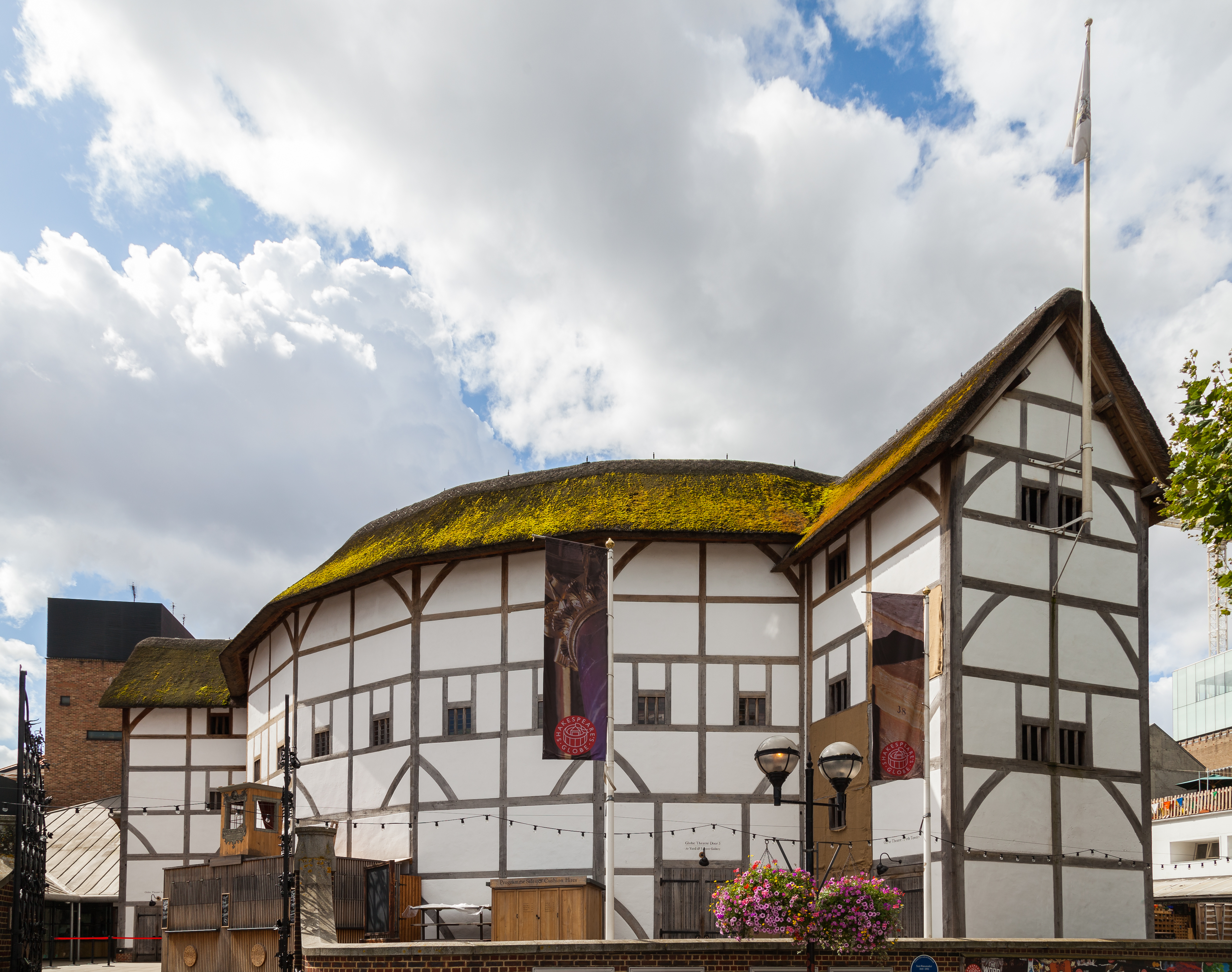
Shakespeare's Globe is a modern reconstruction of the Globe Theatre on the south bank of the Thames.

Islington's 1 mile (1.6 km) long Upper Street has more bars and restaurants than any other British street. Europe's busiest shopping area and England's longest shopping street is Oxford Street, nearly 1 mile (1.6 km) long. One of the world's largest retail destinations, London ranks near the top of retail sales of any city. In 2017, London was ranked the top city for luxury store openings. London Fashion Week takes place in February and September.

Gastronomic centres include Brick Lane for Bangladeshi and Chinatown for Chinese food. Around 1860, the first fish and chips shop in London opened in Bow. Many cafes serve a full English breakfast all day. London has five 3-Michelin star restaurants. Many hotels provide a traditional afternoon tea service. The nation's most popular biscuit to dunk in tea, chocolate digestives, have been manufactured in Harlesden by McVitie's since 1925.

Annual events begin with the New Year's Day Parade and a fireworks display at the London Eye. The world's second largest street party, the Notting Hill Carnival, is held on the late August Bank Holiday each year. Traditional parades include November's Lord Mayor's Show celebrating the appointment of a new Lord Mayor, while June's Trooping the Colour, a formal military pageant and flypast, celebrates the King's Official Birthday. The Boishakhi Mela, the largest open-air Asian festival in Europe, celebrates the Bengali New Year. First held in 1862, the RHS Chelsea Flower Show (run by the Royal Horticultural Society) takes place in May.

=== LGBTQ scene ===
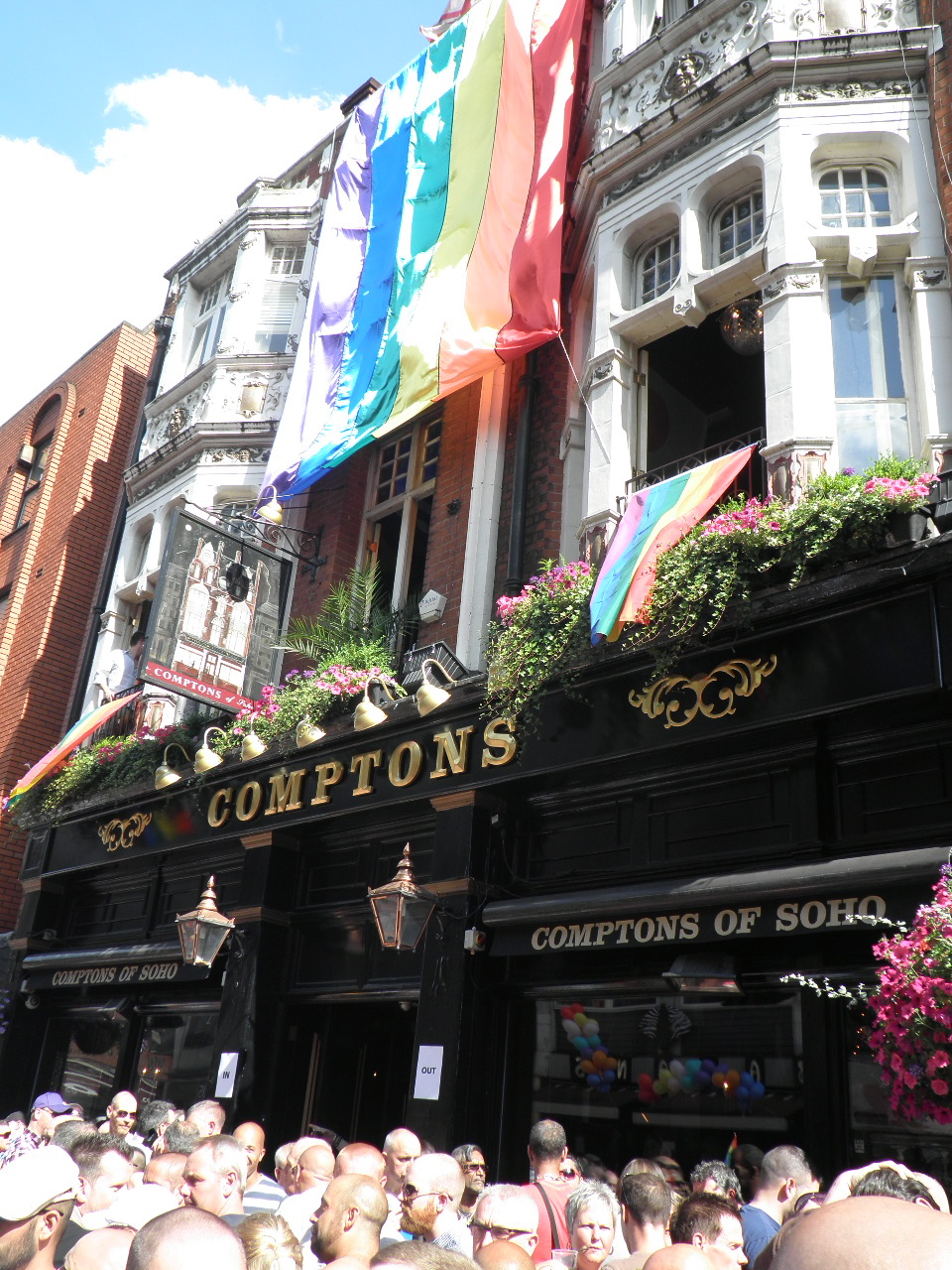
Comptons of Soho during London Pride in 2010

The first gay bar in London in the modern sense was The Cave of the Golden Calf, established as a nightclub in an underground location at 9 Heddon Street, just off Regent Street, in 1912 and "which developed a reputation for sexual freedom and tolerance of same-sex relations". While London has been an LGBT tourism destination, after homosexuality was decriminalised in England in 1967 gay bar culture became more visible, and from the early 1970s Soho (and in particular Old Compton Street) became the centre of the London LGBTQ community. London has been ranked among the world's most LGBTQ-inclusive cities in global indices, and is part of a wider network of globally ranked cities that attract significant international LGBTQ tourism and host major pride events.

=== Literature, film and television ===
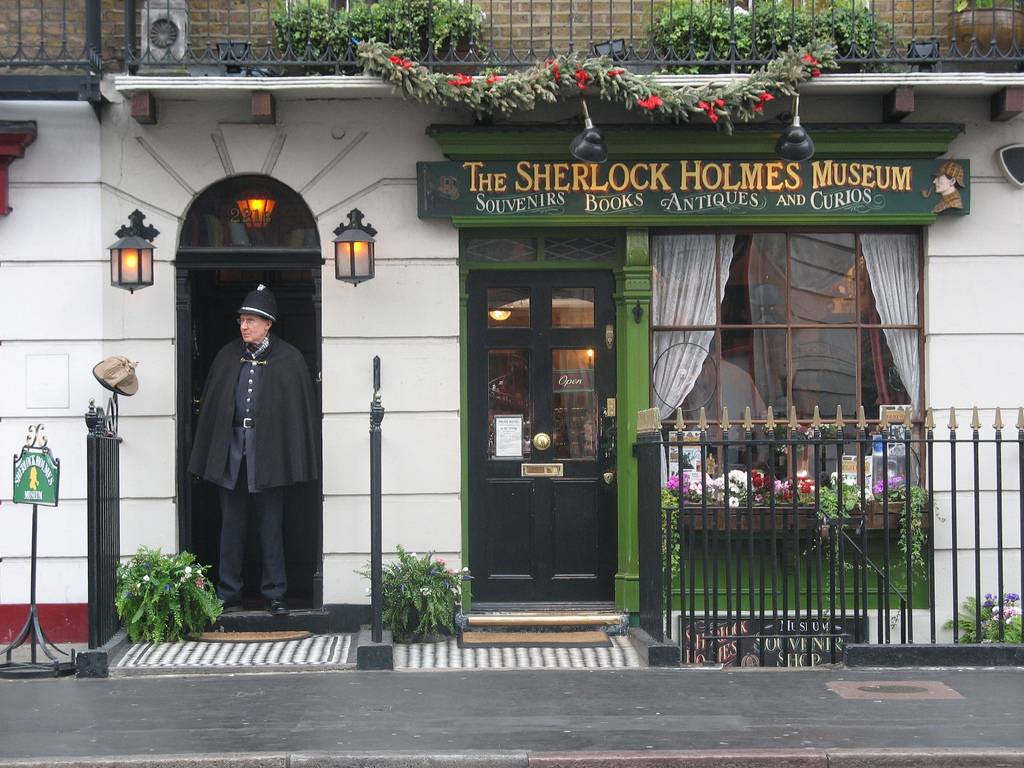
Sherlock Holmes Museum in Baker Street, bearing the number 221B

London has been the setting for many works of literature. The pilgrims in Geoffrey Chaucer's late 14th-century Canterbury Tales set out for Canterbury from London. William Shakespeare spent a large part of his life living and working in London; his contemporary Ben Jonson was based there, and his play The Alchemist was set in the city. A Journal of the Plague Year (1722) by Daniel Defoe is a fictionalisation of the events of the 1665 Great Plague.

The literary centres of London were hilly Hampstead and Bloomsbury. Writers included the diarist Samuel Pepys, recording the Great Fire; Charles Dickens, describing foggy, grimy Victorian London; and the modernist Virginia Woolf. Letitia Elizabeth Landon wrote Calendar of the London Seasons in 1834, while Arthur Conan Doyle wrote the Sherlock Holmes stories. Robert Louis Stevenson narrated the Strange Case of Dr Jekyll and Mr Hyde, a gothic London novella. In 1898 H. G. Wells' science fiction novel The War of the Worlds sees London invaded by Martians. In 1925, Winnie-the-Pooh debuted in London's Evening News. In the 1940s, George Orwell wrote essays in the London Evening Standard, including "The Moon Under Water" (an ideal pub). Wartime evacuation of children is depicted in C. S. Lewis's The Lion, the Witch and the Wardrobe. In 1958 Michael Bond created the refugee Paddington Bear. Buckingham Palace appears in Roald Dahl's The BFG.

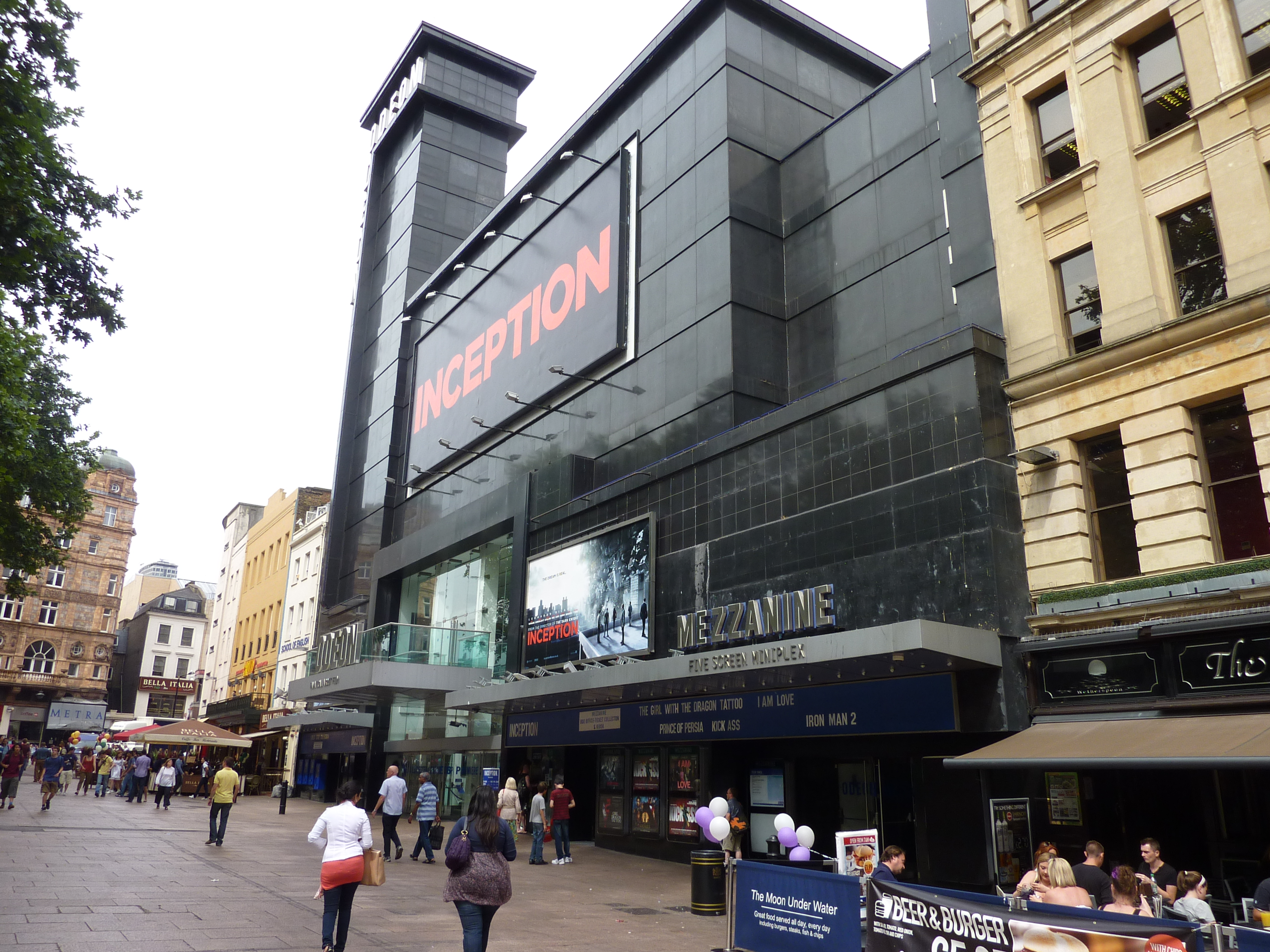
Opened in 1937, the Odeon cinema in Leicester Square hosts European and world film premieres.

London's film studios have produced many films including the James Bond and Harry Potter series. A post-production community is centred in Soho, and London houses six of the world's largest visual effects companies, such as Framestore. The Imaginarium, a digital performance-capture studio, was founded by Andy Serkis. London has been the setting for numerous films. The largest cinema chain in the country, Odeon Cinemas, was founded in London in 1928 by Oscar Deutsch. The BFI IMAX on the South Bank is the largest cinema screen in the UK. The British Academy Film Awards have been held in London since 1949, with the BAFTA Fellowship the Academy's highest accolade. Founded in 1957, the BFI London Film Festival takes place over two weeks every October. London is home to several television production companies which produce several programmes.

=== Museums, art galleries and libraries ===
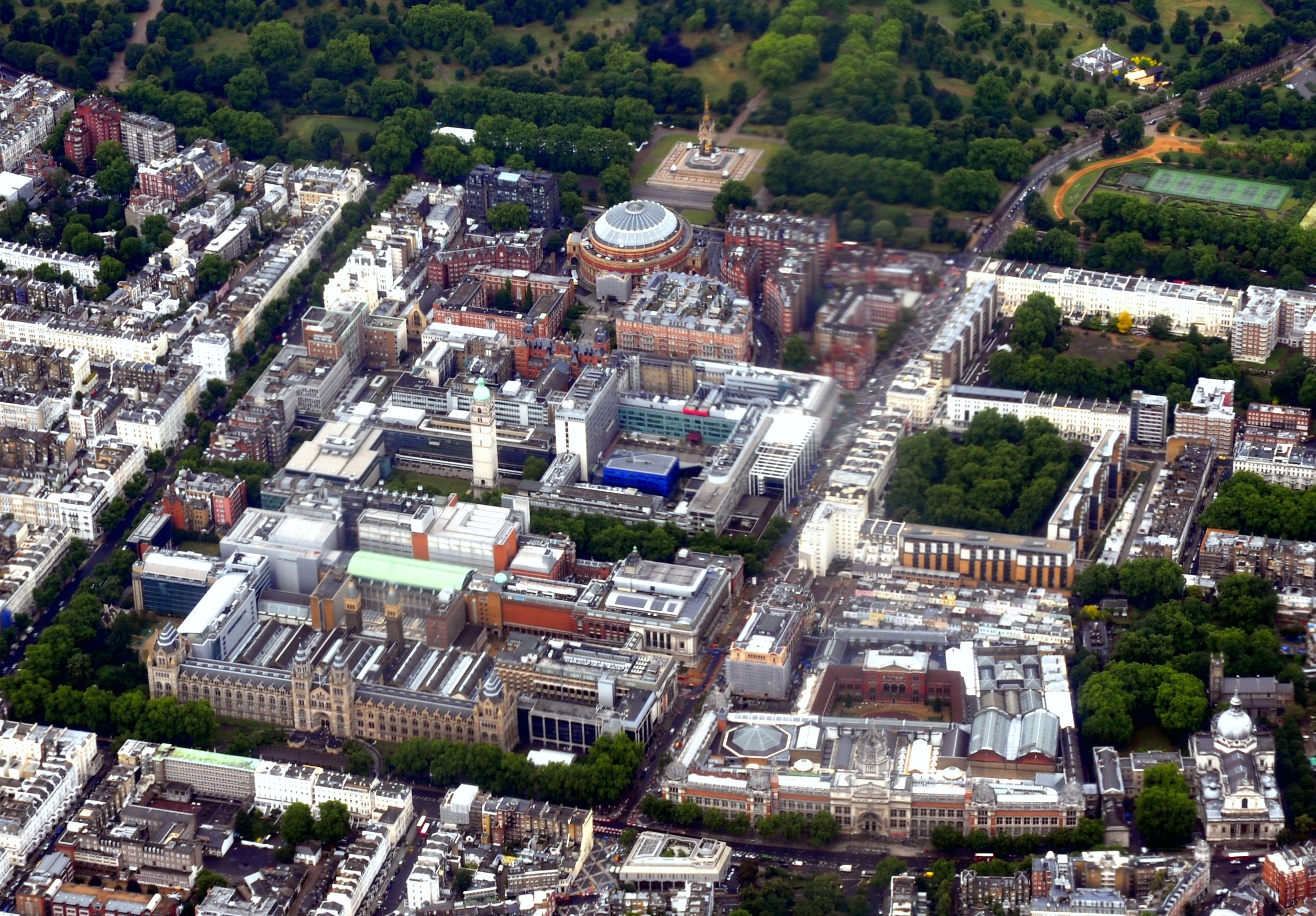
Aerial view of Albertopolis. The Albert Memorial, Royal Albert Hall, Royal Geographical Society, and Royal College of Art are near the top; V&A and Natural History Museum at the lower end; Imperial, Royal College of Music, and Science Museum in between.

London is home to many museums, galleries, and other institutions, many of which are free of admission charges and are major tourist attractions as well as playing a research role. The first to be established was the British Museum in Bloomsbury, in 1753. Originally containing antiquities, natural history specimens, and the national library, the museum now has 7 million artefacts from around the globe. In 1824 the National Gallery was founded to house the British national collection of Western paintings and is located in Trafalgar Square.

The British Library is the second largest library in the world, and the UK's national library. Research libraries include the Wellcome Library and Dana Centre, as well as university libraries like the British Library of Political and Economic Science at LSE, the Abdus Salam Library at Imperial, the Maughan Library at King's, and the Senate House Libraries at the University of London.

In the 19th century, South Kensington was developed as "Albertopolis", a cultural and scientific quarter. Three major national museums are there: the Victoria and Albert Museum, the Natural History Museum and the Science Museum. The National Portrait Gallery was founded in 1856 to house depictions of figures from British history; its holdings now comprise the world's most extensive collection of portraits. The national gallery of British art is at Tate Britain, originally established as an annexe of the National Gallery in 1897. The Tate Gallery became a major centre for modern art. In 2000 this collection moved to Tate Modern, a new gallery housed in the former Bankside Power Station.

=== Music ===
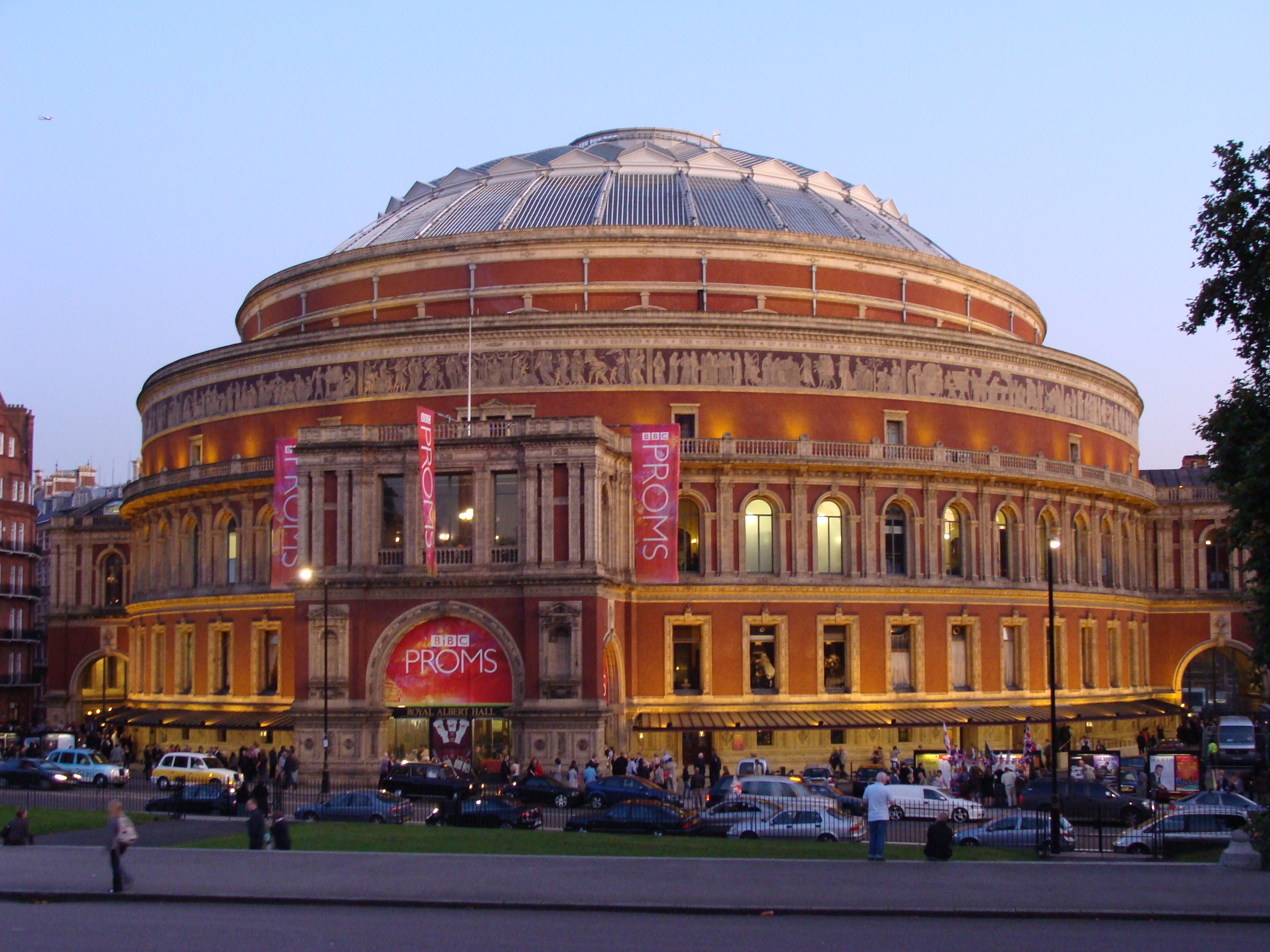
The Royal Albert Hall in South Kensington hosts concerts and musical events, including the classical music festival The Proms which are held every summer, as well as cinema screenings of films accompanied with live orchestral music.

London is one of the major classical and popular music capitals of the world and hosts major music corporations, such as Universal Music Group International and Warner Music Group, and countless bands, musicians and industry professionals. The city contains many orchestras and concert halls, such as the Barbican Arts Centre, the Southbank Centre, Cadogan Hall and the Royal Albert Hall. London's two main opera houses are the Royal Opera House and the London Coliseum. Several conservatoires are within the city: Royal Academy of Music, Royal College of Music, Guildhall School of Music and Drama, and Trinity Laban. The record label EMI was formed in the city in 1931, and an early employee for the company, Alan Blumlein, created stereo sound that year. The guitar amp engineer Jim Marshall founded Marshall Amplification in London in 1962.

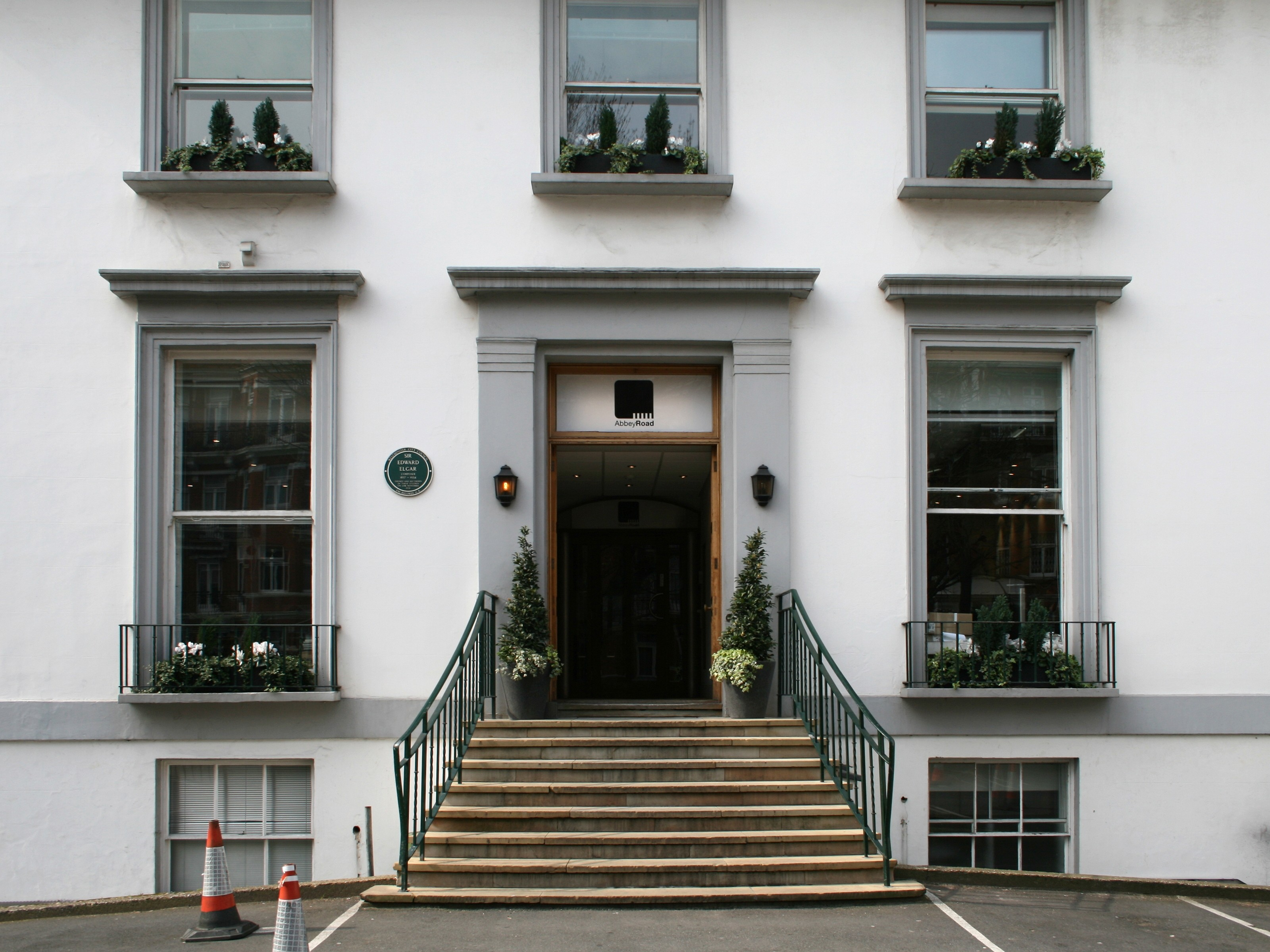
Abbey Road Studios

London has numerous venues for rock and pop concerts, including the world's busiest indoor venue, the O_{2} Arena, and Wembley Arena, as well as many mid-sized venues, such as Brixton Academy, the Hammersmith Apollo and the Shepherd's Bush Empire. Several music festivals, including the Wireless Festival, Lovebox, and Hyde Park's British Summer Time, are held in London. The city is home to the original Hard Rock Cafe and the Abbey Road Studios, where the Beatles recorded many of their hits.

London has been instrumental in the development of punk music and other genres. Artists from London played a prominent role in the development of synth-pop, including Eurythmics, whose "Sweet Dreams (Are Made of This)" was recorded in the attic of their north London home, heralding a trend for home recording methods. Many alternative artists have been based in London; others have brought a Caribbean influence. London is a centre for urban music. In particular the genres UK garage, drum and bass, dubstep, grime and UK underground evolved in the city from the foreign genres of house, hip-hop and reggae, alongside local drum and bass. Music station BBC Radio 1Xtra was set up to support the rise of local urban contemporary music. The British Phonographic Industry's annual popular music awards, the Brit Awards, are held in London.

== Recreation ==
=== Parks and open spaces ===
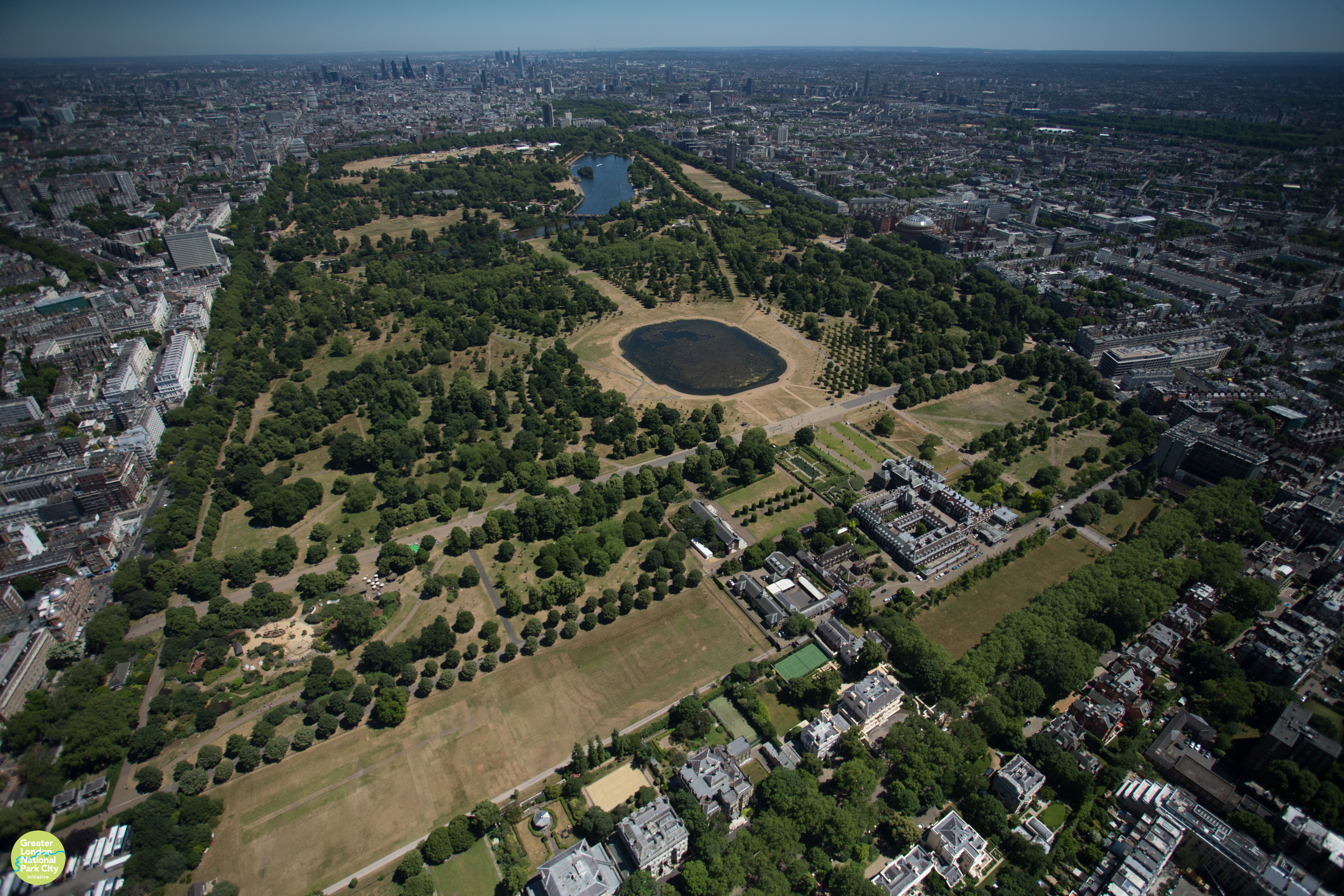
Hyde Park (with Kensington Gardens in the foreground) has been a popular public space since it opened in 1637.

A 2013 report by the City of London Corporation said that London is the "greenest city" in Europe with 35,000 acres (14,164 hectares) of public parks, woodlands and gardens. Nearly half of London's area is green and blue spaces, featuring around 3,000 parks, over 8 million trees, and 150 nature reserves.

The largest parks in the central area of London are three of the eight Royal Parks, namely Hyde Park and its neighbour Kensington Gardens in the west, and Regent's Park to the north. Hyde Park is popular for sports and sometimes hosts open-air concerts. Regent's Park contains London Zoo, the world's oldest scientific zoo. Primrose Hill is a popular spot from which to view the city skyline. Close to Hyde Park are smaller Royal Parks, Green Park and St James's Park. Several large parks lie outside the city centre, including Hampstead Heath and the remaining Royal Parks of Greenwich Park to the southeast, and Bushy Park and Richmond Park (the largest) to the southwest. Crystal Palace Park in south-east London was laid out as a pleasure ground, and, reflecting the public enthusiasm for dinosaurs that first developed in Victorian England, it contains life-sized models of dinosaurs.

Close to Richmond Park is Kew Gardens, which has the world's largest collection of living plants. Many parks are administered by borough Councils, including Victoria Park in the East End and Battersea Park in the centre. Some more informal, semi-natural open spaces, including Hampstead Heath and Epping Forest, are controlled by the City of London Corporation. Hampstead Heath incorporates Kenwood House, a former stately home and a popular location in the summer months when classical musical concerts are held by the lake. Epping Forest is a popular venue for various outdoor activities, including mountain biking, walking, horse riding, golf, angling, and orienteering. Three of the UK's most-visited theme parks, Thorpe Park near Staines-upon-Thames, Chessington World of Adventures in Chessington and Legoland Windsor, are located within 20 miles (32 km) of London.

=== Walking ===
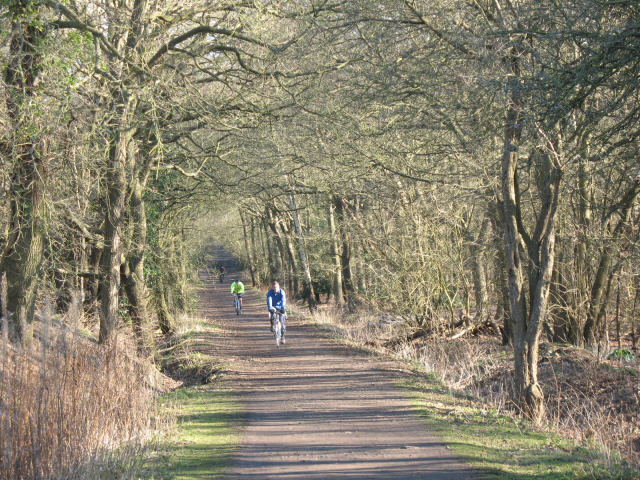
The Horse Ride is a tree tunnel (route overhung by trees) on the western side of Wimbledon Common.

Areas that provide for walks include Wimbledon Common, Epping Forest, Hampton Court Park, Hampstead Heath, the eight Royal Parks, Regents Canal Walk, canals and disused railway tracks. Access to canals and rivers has improved recently, including the creation of the Thames Path, some 28 miles (45 km) of which is within Greater London, and the Wandle Trail along the River Wandle.

Other long-distance paths, linking green spaces, have been created, including the Capital Ring, the Green Chain Walk, London Outer Orbital Path ("Loop"), Jubilee Walkway, Lea Valley Walk and the Diana, Princess of Wales Memorial Walk.

== Sport ==
London has hosted the Summer Olympics in 1908, 1948, and 2012, making it the first city to host the modern Games three times. The city was host to the British Empire Games in 1934. In 2017, London hosted the World Championships in Athletics for the first time.

London's most popular sport is association football, with six clubs in the Premier League in the 2026–27 season: Arsenal, Brentford, Chelsea, Crystal Palace, Fulham and Tottenham Hotspur. Five London-based teams are in the Women's Super League: Arsenal, Chelsea, London City Lionesses, Tottenham and West Ham United.

Two Premiership Rugby union teams are based in Greater London: Harlequins and Saracens. Ealing Trailfinders and Richmond play in the RFU Championship; other rugby union clubs in the city include London Scottish, Rosslyn Park, Westcombe Park, and Blackheath. Twickenham Stadium in south-west London hosts home matches for the England national rugby union team. While rugby league is more popular in the north of England, the sport has one professional club in London – the London Broncos, while the Challenge Cup final often takes place in the city.

The Wimbledon Tennis Championships is held at the All England Club in the south-western suburb of Wimbledon since 1877. Played in late June to early July, it is the oldest tennis tournament in the world and widely considered the most prestigious.

London has two Test cricket grounds which host the England cricket team, Lord's (home of Middlesex C.C.C.) and the Oval (home of Surrey C.C.C.). Lord's has hosted four finals of the Cricket World Cup and is known as the "Home of Cricket". In golf, the Wentworth Club is located in Virginia Water, Surrey on the south-west fringes of London, while the closest venue to London that is used as one of the courses for the Open Championship, the oldest major and tournament in golf, is Royal St George's in Sandwich, Kent. The rules of modern boxing, the Queensberry Rules, were formulated in London in 1867, and since then fights have taken place at York Hall (the spiritual home of British boxing), and larger arenas and stadiums across the city. Alexandra Palace in north London hosts the PDC World Darts Championship and the Masters snooker tournament. Other key annual events are the mass-participation London Marathon and the University Boat Race on the Thames contested between Oxford and Cambridge.

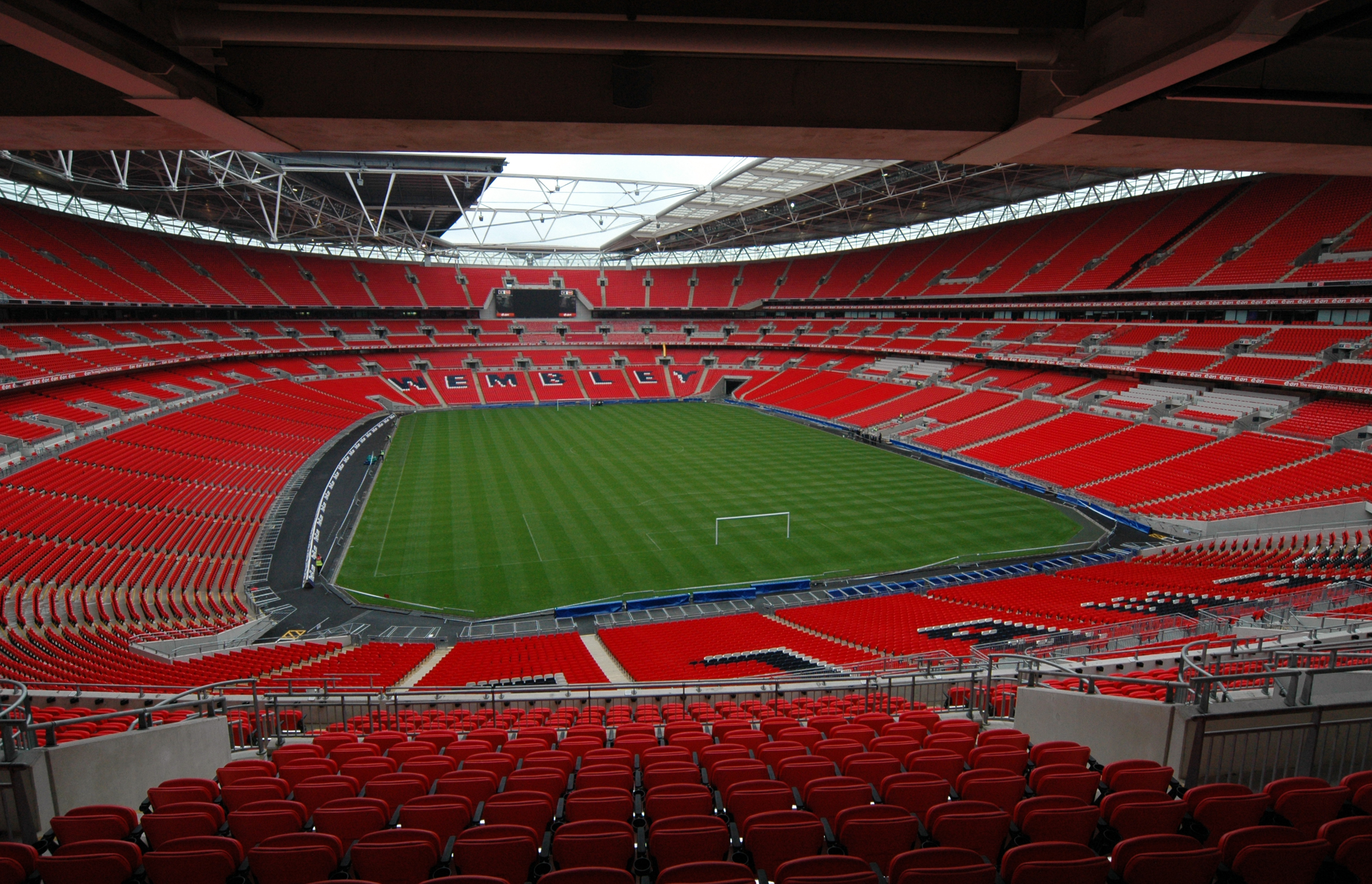
Wembley Stadium, home of the England men and women's football team and the FA Cup Final, has a seating capacity of 90,000. It is the UK's biggest stadium.

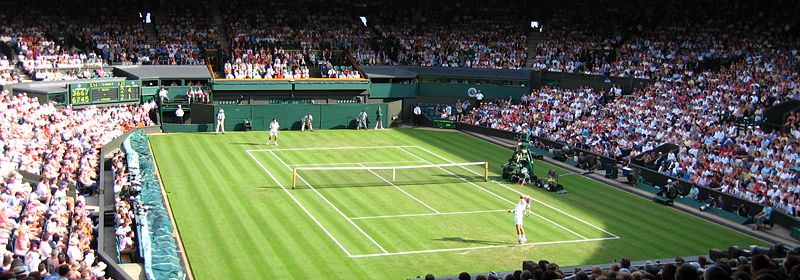
Centre Court at Wimbledon. Held every June and July, Wimbledon is the oldest tennis tournament in the world, and the only major played on grass.

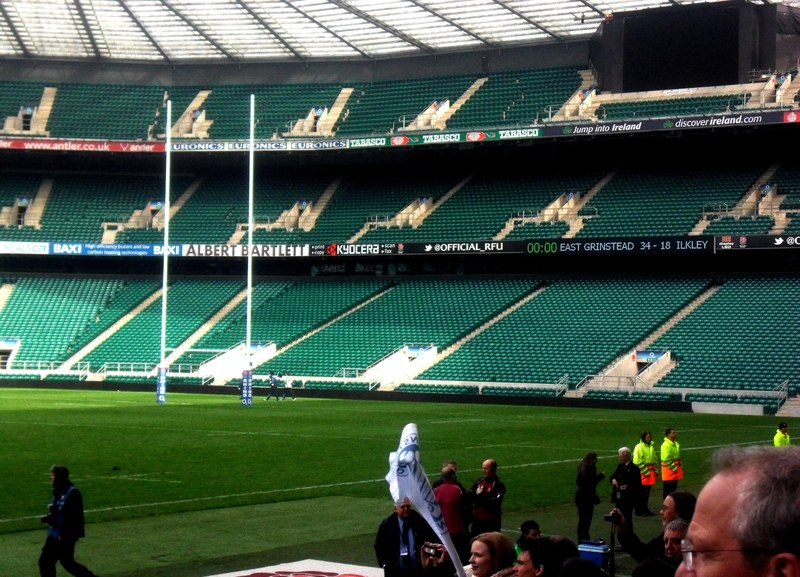
Twickenham, home of the England national rugby union team, has a capacity of 82,000 seats.

== See also ==
- Outline of England
- Outline of London
- Outline of the United Kingdom
