= Outline of London =

Capital and largest city of both England and the United Kingdom

The following outline is provided as an overview of and topical guide to the city known as London:

London – capital and largest city of England and the United Kingdom. On the River Thames in the south east of the island of Great Britain, London has been a major settlement for two millennia. It was founded by the Romans, who named it Londinium. London is a cultural capital and leading global city in the arts, commerce, education, entertainment, fashion, finance, healthcare, media, professional services, research and development, tourism, and transport. It is the world's financial capital and has the fifth-or sixth-largest metropolitan area GDP in the world.

== General reference ==
- Panorama of London
- Pronunciation: /ˈlʌndən/
- Etymology of London
- Adjectival(s): London
- Demonym(s): Londoner

== Geography of London ==
Geography of London

- Panorama of London

=== Location of London ===
- London is situated in the following regions:
  - Northern Hemisphere, Western Hemisphere & Eastern Hemisphere (on the Prime meridian)
    - Atlantic Ocean
    - Eurasia
      - Europe
        - Northern Europe
        - Western Europe
          - British Isles
            - United Kingdom
              - Great Britain
                - England
                  - London commuter belt
                    - Greater London Built-up Area
                      - Greater London
  - Time zone: Western European Time (UTC±00:00), Coordinated Universal Time (UTC±00:00), Greenwich Mean Time

=== Environment of London ===
- Climate of London
- Geology of London

=== Geographical features of London ===
- Thames Barrier

==== Landforms of London ====
- River Thames
- Subterranean rivers of London

==== Areas of London ====
- Central London
- East London
- Inner London
- London postal district
- Metropolitan Green Belt
- North London
- Outer London
- South London
- Outer London
- Subterranean London
- West London

=== Locations in London ===
==== Historic sites ====
- Barbican Estate
- Catacombs of London
- Covent Garden
- Leicester Square
- Mayfair
- Piccadilly Circus
- St Paul's Cathedral
- Tower Bridge
- Trafalgar Square
- World Heritage Sites
  - Tower of London
  - Kew Gardens
  - Maritime Greenwich
    - Royal Observatory, Greenwich
  - Westminster site
    - Palace of Westminster
    - Westminster Abbey
    - Saint Margaret's Church

==== British Royal Family ====
British royal family

- Buckingham Palace
- Clarence House
- Hampton Court Palace
- Horse Guards Parade
- Kensington Palace
- The Mall, London
- St James's Palace

==== Modern attractions ====
- 8 Canada Square
- 30 St Mary Axe
- Canary Wharf
- Citigroup Centre, London
- London Eye
- Millennium Bridge, London
- The O2 Arena
  - Millennium Dome
- One Canada Square
- The Pinnacle (London)
- The Shard
- Tower 42
- Wembley Stadium

==== Museums and galleries in London ====
Museums
and galleries

- British Museum
- Imperial War Museum
- Museum of London
- National Gallery
- National Maritime Museum
- National Portrait Gallery, London
- Natural History Museum, London
- Science Museum, London
- Tate Britain
- Tate Modern
- Victoria and Albert Museum

==== Parks and open spaces ====
- Royal Parks of London
- Battersea Park
- Clapham Common
- Green Park
- Greenwich Park
- Hyde Park, London
- Kensington Gardens
- Regent's Park
- St. James's Park

==== Monuments ====
- Albert Memorial
- Cenotaph
- Cleopatra's Needle
- Monument to the Great Fire of London
- Nelson's Column
- more ...

==== Retail locations ====
- Bond Street
- Carnaby Street
- Harrods
- Harvey Nichols
- Knightsbridge
- Liberty (department store)
- Oxford Street
- Regent Street
- Selfridges
- Tottenham Court Road

==== Civic buildings ====
- Bow Street Magistrates' Court
- City Hall, London
- City of London Police
- London Ambulance Service
- London Fire Brigade
- Mayor of London
- Metropolitan Police Service
- Scotland Yard
- Old Bailey
- Royal Courts of Justice

=== Demographics of London ===
- Demographics of London

== Politics of London ==
=== London government ===
London government

- History of local government in London
- Mayor of London
- Greater London Authority
- London Assembly
- City of London Corporation
- Ken Livingstone
- London Development Agency
- City Hall, London
- London Plan
- Metropolitan Board of Works
- Greater London Council
- London County Council

=== Subdivisions ===
- City of London
- London boroughs
  - List of London boroughs
    - London Borough of Barking and Dagenham
    - London Borough of Barnet
    - London Borough of Bexley
    - London Borough of Brent
    - London Borough of Bromley
    - London Borough of Camden
    - London Borough of Croydon
    - London Borough of Ealing
    - London Borough of Enfield
    - Royal Borough of Greenwich
    - London Borough of Hackney
    - London Borough of Hammersmith and Fulham
    - London Borough of Haringey
    - London Borough of Harrow
    - London Borough of Havering
    - London Borough of Hillingdon
    - London Borough of Hounslow
    - London Borough of Islington
    - Royal Borough of Kensington and Chelsea
    - Royal Borough of Kingston upon Thames
    - London Borough of Lambeth
    - London Borough of Lewisham
    - London Borough of Merton
    - London Borough of Newham
    - London Borough of Redbridge
    - London Borough of Richmond upon Thames
    - London Borough of Southwark
    - London Borough of Sutton
    - London Borough of Tower Hamlets
    - London Borough of Waltham Forest
    - London Borough of Wandsworth
    - City of Westminster

==== Historical subdivisions ====
Created through London Government Act 1899 in 1900, these subdivisions were abolished through London Government Act 1963 in 1965.

- County of London - corresponds to present day Inner London
- Metropolitan boroughs of the County of London
  - Metropolitan Borough of Battersea
  - Metropolitan Borough of Bermondsey
  - Metropolitan Borough of Bethnal Green
  - Metropolitan Borough of Camberwell
  - Metropolitan Borough of Chelsea
  - Metropolitan Borough of Deptford
  - Metropolitan Borough of Finsbury
  - Metropolitan Borough of Fulham
  - Metropolitan Borough of Greenwich
  - Metropolitan Borough of Hackney
  - Metropolitan Borough of Hammersmith
  - Metropolitan Borough of Hampstead
  - Metropolitan Borough of Holborn
  - Metropolitan Borough of Islington
  - Metropolitan Borough of Kensington
  - Metropolitan Borough of Lambeth
  - Metropolitan Borough of Lewisham
  - Metropolitan Borough of Paddington
  - Metropolitan Borough of Poplar
  - Metropolitan Borough of Shoreditch
  - Metropolitan Borough of Southwark
  - Metropolitan Borough of St Marylebone
  - Metropolitan Borough of St Pancras
  - Metropolitan Borough of Stepney
  - Metropolitan Borough of Stoke Newington
  - Metropolitan Borough of Wandsworth
  - Metropolitan Borough of Westminster
  - Metropolitan Borough of Woolwich
- List of civil parishes in the County of London in 1891

=== Law enforcement in London ===
- Crime in London
- Law enforcement agencies in London
  - Metropolitan Police Service ("The MET")
    - Scotland Yard (MET headquarters)
    - Commissioner of Police of the Metropolis
    - Deputy Commissioner of Police of the Metropolis
- Operation Sassoon

=== UK government in London ===
- Downing Street
- Thames House
- SIS (MI6)
- Middlesex Guildhall
- Palace of Westminster
- Palace of Whitehall
- Portcullis House
- Somerset House
- War Office
- Whitehall

== History of London ==
History of London

=== History of London, by important milestones ===
- City of London
- Lundenwic
- Peasants' Revolt
- Black Death
- Great Plague of London
- Livery Company
- Great Fire of London
- Industrial Revolution
- British Empire
- Great Stink
- The Great Exhibition
- Cool Britannia

=== History of London, by period ===
History of London (timeline)

- Londinium (Roman London)
- Anglo-Saxon London
- Norman and Medieval London
  - London uprising
- Tudor London
- Stuart London
  - Great Plague of London
  - Great Fire of London
- 18th-century London
- 19th-century London
- 20th-century London
  - History of London (1900–1939)
  - London during World War II
    - The Blitz
      - Second Great Fire of London
  - Modern London (from 1945)
  - Swinging London (London in the 1960s)

=== History of London, by subject ===
- Disasters
  - Fires
    - Early fires of London
    - Great Fire of London
    - Second Great Fire of London
  - Disease
    - Great Plague of London
    - COVID-19 pandemic in London
  - Attacks
    - London uprising
    - Siege of London (1471)
    - The Blitz
    - List of terrorist incidents in London
      - 7 July 2005 London bombings
- History of local government in London
- History of London Transport

== Culture of London ==
Culture of London

- Architecture of London
  - Hotels in London
- Events in London
  - Annual events in London
- LGBT culture in London
- Tourism in London
  - Hotels in London
- Venues in London

=== Art in London ===
- Panorama of London

==== Music of London ====
- Camerata of London
- London Jazz Festival
- London Philharmonic Orchestra
- London Symphony Orchestra
- Royal Opera House
- Royal Philharmonic Orchestra

==== Theatre in London ====
- West End theatre
- List of London venues

=== Language in London ===
- Cockney Accent, the heritage working-class accent of London.
- Estuary English, a London-derived variety of English spoken widely in South and East London, especially among former multi-generational Londoners who were priced out of their neighbourhoods or chose to move to suburbs.
- Cockney Rhyming Slang, a traditional London language-game and form of slang word construction highly tied to the indigenous culture of London.
- Received Pronunciation, the school-taught accent associated with aristocracy and the highly-educated in Southern England, especially London.
- London Multicultural English, a recent ethnolect developing in London among multicultural communities, particularly influenced by the Windrush Generation.

=== People of London ===
- List of people from London
- Ethnic groups in London
  - Chinese community in London

=== Religion in London ===
Religion in London

- List of cemeteries in London
- Christianity in London
- Islam in London

=== Sport in London ===
Sport in London

- Football in London

==== Sports clubs in London ====
- Cricket
  - Marylebone Cricket Club
  - Middlesex County Cricket Club
  - Surrey County Cricket Club
- Rugby union
  - Harlequin F.C.
  - London Wasps
  - London Welsh RFC
  - Saracens F.C.
- Rugby league
  - London Broncos

==== Sports events in London ====
- Olympics
  - 1908 Summer Olympics
  - 1948 Summer Olympics
  - 2012 Summer Olympics
- London Marathon
- The Championships, Wimbledon
- London Grand Prix

==== Sports venues in London ====
- All England Lawn Tennis and Croquet Club
- Boleyn Ground
- Craven Cottage
- Crystal Palace National Sports Centre
- Emirates Stadium
- ExCeL London
- Herne Hill Velodrome
- Lord's Cricket Ground
- Olympic Stadium (London)
- Stamford Bridge (stadium)
- The Oval
- The Valley (London)
- Twickenham Stadium
- Wembley Stadium
- White Hart Lane

== Economy and infrastructure of London ==
Economy of London

- Agriculture in London
- Banking in London
  - List of banks in the United Kingdom
  - Bank of England
- Hotels in London
- Media in London
- London Internet Exchange
- London Stock Exchange
- Tourism in London
  - Hotels in London
- Water supply and sanitation in London
  - Waste disposal authorities in London
- City of London
- City of London Corporation
- Institute of Economic Affairs
- Livery Company
- London Docklands

=== Transportation in London ===
Transport in London

- Transport administration
  - Port of London Authority
  - Transport for London
    - London Buses
    - Transport for London red routes
    - London Rail
- Air transport in London
  - Airports of London
- Cycling in London
- Public transport in London
  - Bus transport in London
    - Buses in London
      - AEC Routemaster
      - New Routemaster
      - Articulated buses in London
      - more...
  - Rail transport in London
    - London Underground
    - Docklands Light Railway
    - Tramlink
- Ship transport in London
  - Port of London

== Education in London ==
Education in London

- List of universities and higher education colleges in London
  - Guildhall School of Music and Drama
  - Imperial College London
  - Institute of Education
  - King's College London
  - London School of Economics
  - Middlesex University
  - Queen Mary, University of London
  - Royal Academy of Music
  - Royal College of Music
  - Royal Institution
  - SOAS, University of London
  - Trinity Laban Conservatoire of Music and Dance
  - University College London
  - University of Greenwich
  - University of London

== See also ==
- 020
- Home counties
