= Kerrang! Awards =

UK annual music awards show

- Awarded for: Music achievement
- Location: London, England
- Country: United Kingdom
- Presented by: Kerrang!
- First award: 1994
- Final award: 2022
- Website: awards.kerrang.com

Television/radio coverage
- Network: MTV UK; MTV Europe; Channel 4 (2001–2004); 4Music (2008); Kerrang! TV

The Kerrang! Awards was an annual music awards show in the United Kingdom, founded by the music magazine Kerrang! and focusing primarily on rock music. The annual awards featured performances by prominent artists, and some of the awards of more popular interest are presented in a televised ceremony.

== History ==
Since they began in 1994, the Kerrang! Awards became one of Britain's most recognised music award events by the now-defunct Guinness Book of British Hit Singles & Albums, often listing some of the winners in their annual round-up of the previous year. The event is presented by major music celebrities, with many others outside the industry who attend the event, sometimes presenting the awards with one example being Jodie Marsh in 2003 presenting Feeder with their Best British Band award. Although he did not present an award, the internationally successful singer Seal, was spotted by A frontman Jason Perry at the 2002 event, with this being revealed on the CD/DVD edition of their album Hi-Fi Serious in which the disc includes live performances and a video diary of their award win.

Perhaps one of the notable events during the awards 28 year history, was the ceremony of 2000, in which Slipknot set fire to their table after winning Best Band in the World. Lostprophets nearly became the first act to win three times in succession the Best British Band award, but lost to Bullet for My Valentine in 2008, who later achieved the succession in 2010. It has since been suggested, that since Ian Watkins' conviction, Lostprophets awards should be rescinded. Thirty Seconds to Mars holds the record for most Best Single wins at three. The band is also the first artist to win Best Single in two consecutive years at the Kerrang! Awards 2007 and Kerrang! Awards 2008. Many international companies, including Island Records, Orange Music Electronic Company and Marshall Amplification, were involved in the sponsorship of the various award categories.

It was noted that the awards sometimes did not adhere to a strict "biggest is best" code, as some of the winners and nominees for the newer awards, such as Best International Newcomer, have been awarded to bands with either minor exposure or a strong live reputation, such as 2010 Best International Newcomer winners Trash Talk. There have also been controversial winners of these awards. An example of this being the winners of Best British Newcomer and Best International Newcomer, from the 2006 event (Bring Me the Horizon and Aiden). However, most of the categories ever since the first ceremony in 1994 have honored artists who have experienced notable commercial chart success at the time of winning their award, with Best British Band, Best International Band and Hall of Fame being examples.

Despite the awards being discontinued by the magazine, winning one has still been seen as an important achievement and event of an artist career, with Feeder's frontman Grant Nicholas saying that their 2003 accolade, was the award their late drummer Jon Lee had always wanted the band to win, with Nicholas dedicating the award to him. That same year, Justin Hawkins of The Darkness expressed his disappointment at not winning Best British Newcomer, as it would have meant the band winning every award they were nominated for, only to have this denied by Funeral for a Friend. Also that same year, Good Charlotte received disdain from the crowd in attendance when they were announced as winners of "Best Single". The 23rd Kerrang! Awards were held on 13 June 2014, at the Troxy in Stepney, in the East End borough of Tower Hamlets.

In an August 2024 interview with former Visible Noise founder Julie Weir on UPWAWR Podcast, she spoke about how Ian Watkins's crimes not only ruined his band the Lostprophets, but also ended her record company. It was in this same interview she however highlighted the importance of No Devotion winning the 2015 Kerrang Award for their debut album, as she felt it meant that the public still appreciated that the rest of the band were still good songwriters and musicians and everything that was taken away from them, was given back and it was because of this, "one of the nicest pieces of validation the industry could have given them".

The awards ceremony did not take place in 2017, but returned in June 2018 with the likes of Neck Deep, Enter Shikari, Code Orange and Foo Fighters collecting awards, while the event also featured several special guests including Johnny Depp and Justin Hawkins. The event was not broadcast on TV but several acceptance speeches and interviews were uploaded to Kerrang's YouTube channel, and the ceremony naturally received heavy coverage in the following week's edition of the magazine. The Kerrang! Awards did not take place in 2020 or 2021 due to the COVID-19 pandemic, but the ceremony was due to return in June 2022, with the reader nominations period beginning in April 2022.

Since 2023 there has never been any announcement of an awards event, meaning that although the event has ceased, the Heavy Music Awards can be seen as its unofficial successor, as the winners of the 2025 event were announced by Kerrang's radio station, instead of being held at a venue as was the practice during previous years. The number of voters has also dramatically increased ever since the Kerrang! Awards ceased, possibly due to those who used to vote for Kerrang Award winners, deflecting to the Heavys.

== Categories ==
As of the 2018 ceremony, the following awards were presented at the Kerrang! Awards.

- Best Song (formerly 'Best Single')
- Best Album
- Best British Band
- Best International Band
- Best British Breakthrough
- Best International Breakthrough
- Best British Live Act
- Best International Live Act
- Kerrang! Legend
- Kerrang! Inspiration
- Kerrang! Icon

== Television broadcasts ==
The first time the awards were televised, was in 2001 via a recording on Channel 5 in the UK, with Channel 4 also showing a recording at late-nights until 2004. The 2007 awards were televised on the now-defunct Hits music channel, and the 2008 awards were televised on the new 4Music music channel, owned by Channel 4. In the award's early days, MTV UK and MTV Europe would show the award winners collect their award alongside an interview. Since 2001, the award ceremonies have been televised on Kerrang! TV. However, the 2018 ceremony did not air on TV. More recently, the ceremony has been streamed live on YouTube, with highlights later being uploaded to Kerrang's channel.

== See also ==
- List of Kerrang! Award winners
- List of annual events in London
- Heavy Music Awards
