= Delivery After Raid =

1940 photograph by Fred Morley

Delivery After Raid (1940) (Note: This image is a cropped version originally uploaded by The Times. To view the original, uncropped version, see Getty Images.)

Delivery After Raid is a black-and-white photograph taken in London the day after the night air raid of 8-9 October 1940, during the 32nd consecutive night of the Blitz of World War II. It shows the remains of a street in Holborn, Central London, after it was bombed by Nazi Germany's Luftwaffe. A figure dressed as a milkman appears in the foreground, seemingly calm and unperturbed on his usual route, while firefighters in the background work among the smouldering ruins.

The image was staged by press photographer Fred Morley using his assistant who dressed as the deliveryman. The constructed photo accentuates what became known as the "Blitz Spirit", the courage and morale of the British people in spite of the bombings, allowing Morley to bypass military censorship and reveal the actual devastation of the city in the background to the wider world, while also promoting positive propaganda. The photograph is one of a series of constructed or manipulated images used to boost morale during the war.

== Composition ==
The photograph depicts the aftermath of a German bombing of a London street in a working-class neighbourhood during the Blitz in World War II. An outline of buildings appears in the background, still standing on the left and right, as the bright sky shines down from the top centre-right to now destroyed buildings.

The street is difficult to see due to the rubble and detritus completely filling it. Fires still smoulder in the upper-left corner, as steam and smoke rise from where the firefighters, shown slightly blurred in the background with their backs to the camera, hold a firehose as they spray down what is left of the now flattened buildings, extinguishing the last of the blaze.

Directly to the right of the firefighters, the milkman appears in the foreground wearing a shining, white jacket, carrying a crate of milk bottles in his right hand, and a single bottle of milk in the right pocket of his jacket. The man strides confidently through the rubble with a bold, determined look on his face, an incongruous image in the midst of the widespread destruction.

The milkman is sharply in focus, with one of his legs blurred by motion, indicating a slow shutter speed used by the photographer. The arm of the milkman is slightly raised, compositionally aligned with the firehose behind him in the background, as broken structural elements strewn to his lower left, possibly a doorframe, point diagonally in the distance behind him, visually reminding us that this was once a road.

== Background ==
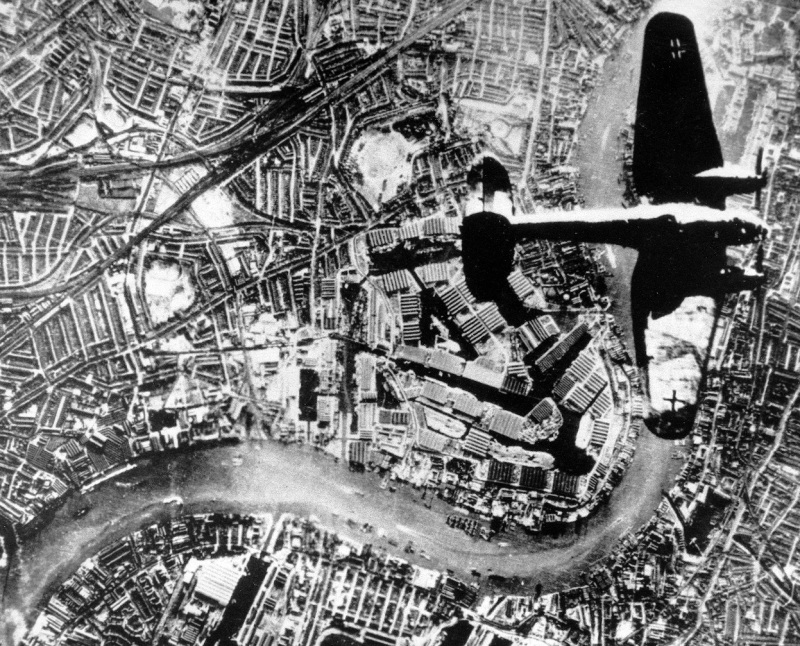
Heinkel He 111, a German bomber flying over London, October 1940

=== Fox Photos ===
In the early 20th century, the British press was headquartered in the Fleet Street region of Central London, England. In 1926, investor Richard Fox, photographer Reginald Salmon, and journalist Ernest Beaver bought the "Special Press" company and changed the name to "Fox Photos". According to curator Sarah McDonald, Fox became known for providing photography services to the new media of the time, which increasingly relied on visual storytelling and led to a burgeoning demand for the services of press photographers.

Fox was also one of the first agencies to use colour film, particularly during its coverage of World War II. They specialized in providing coverage of daily news, transportation, industry, and human interest stories. Highlights of their archival photo collection (Note: According to Rebecca Streiman, Fox Photos meticulously documented their images. "Information was entered daily into daybooks as events unfolded and Fox photographers returned from assignments. Each negative was assigned a consecutive number in addition to a caption, the date and any photographer details, providing an invaluable catalogue of the Fox Photos archive.") show a focus on images portraying workers, soldiers, and energy generation. In January 1926, Fred Morley began working for Fox. The offices of Fox Photos were bombed in the Blitz, and the company lost many of its original files. Morley continued working for the company as a photojournalist after the end of the war. He died in January 1969, aged 67.

The Hulton Press Library, which was officially established in 1947, was acquired by the BBC in 1958. It was maintained as the Hulton Picture Library until 1988 when it was purchased by Brian Deutsch, becoming known as Hulton Deutsch. Fox Photos ceased operations when they were acquired by Hulton in 1989. Getty Images then acquired Hulton in 1996, adding Hulton's assets to its own. (Note: The purchase of the Hulton Press Library by Getty Images was portrayed in the BBC television drama Shooting the Past (1999). The film features Delivery After Raid, first appearing at 19:22 in the original home media release.)

=== The Blitz ===
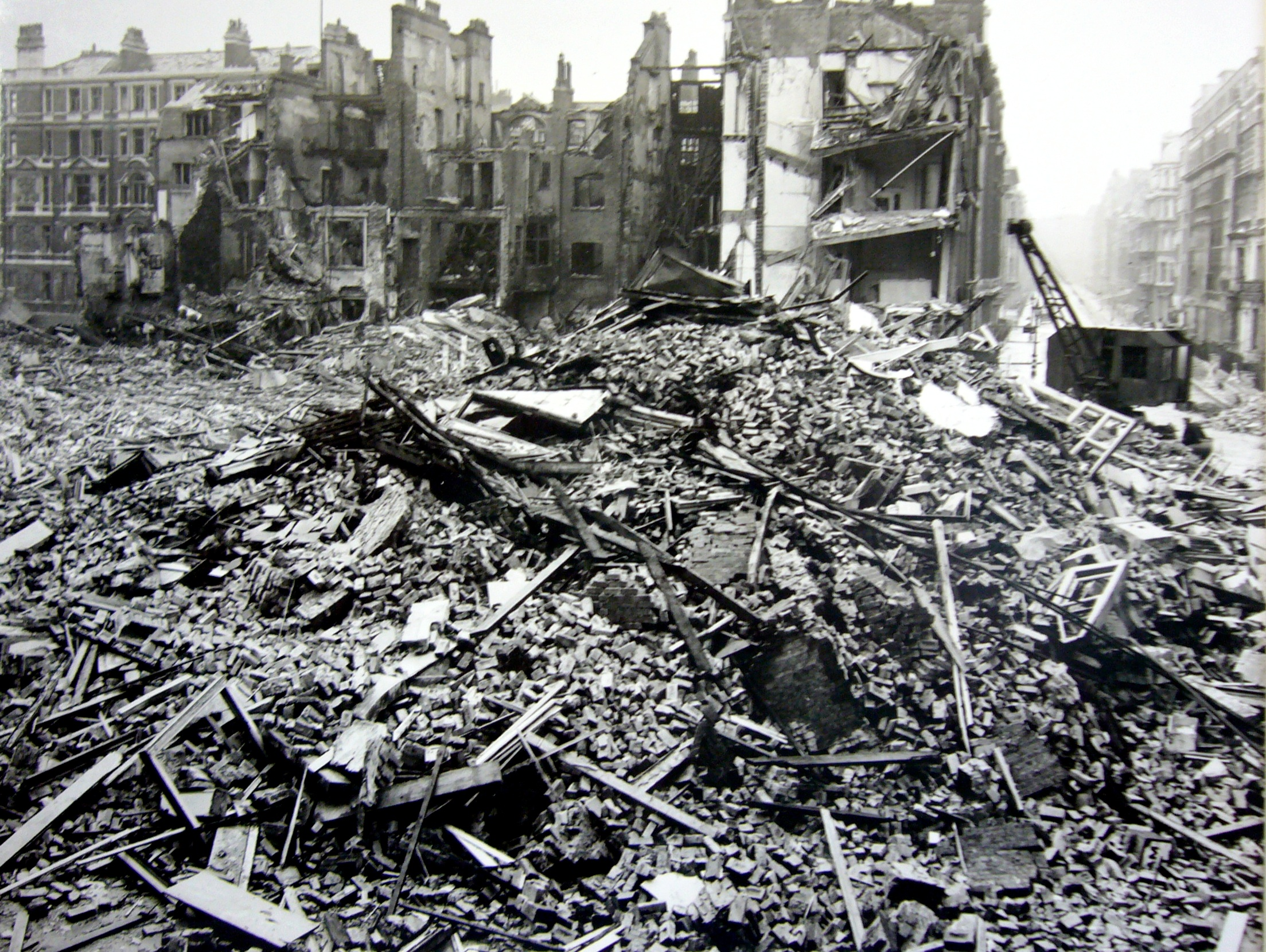
Bomb and blast damage during the Blitz, Westminster, London, 1940

The Battle of Britain began in July 1940 as Nazi Germany's Luftwaffe sought air superiority over Britain in a campaign against the Royal Air Force, a prerequisite for a planned invasion of the United Kingdom. Although the Luftwaffe was perceived as one of the most powerful air forces in the world, Fighter Command successfully defended British airspace against German attacks.

During its final stages, the Luftwaffe launched the Blitz, an eight-month bombing campaign against British cities, shifting from daylight and night attacks to almost exclusively night bombing in October. London was attacked for 57 nights, from September 1940 to May 1941, leading to more than 40,000 civilian deaths and leaving over a million homes and buildings damaged or destroyed.

Shortly after the battle began, Prime Minister Winston Churchill directed the Minister of Information (MOI) (Note: Anthony Rhodes: "Propaganda to the home front and Britain's allies abroad was the responsibility of the Ministry of Information, which had been instituted to inform the public about the war, and how they could help win it...The ministry told Britons about the progress of the war without endangering national security. For these tasks it employed every publicity technique available—films, photographs, broadcasting, booklets, posters, press advertisements, exhibitions, public lectures. It recruited many distinguished publicists, artists, and writers.") on 26 July 1940 to work with the media to control the way they covered the air raids, specifying that "photographs showing shattered houses should not be published unless there is something very peculiar about them...it must be clear that the vast majority of people are not at all affected by any single air raid...Pray try to impress this upon the newspaper authorities, and persuade them to help."

If the photos were questionable, press agencies often submitted their images to the Press & Censorship Bureau of the MOI for review before publishing. Photography scholar James McArdle notes that the British government wanted to avoid any kind of public panic and tried to limit the number of photos showing the destruction from the bombs by censoring images captured by press photographers. Jane McArthur, whose doctoral research examined World War II photographs that were formerly held by the MOI and later deposited in the Imperial War Museum, found that, of the approximately 11,500 photographs taken by the British press of the London bombing, the majority had never been seen by the public.

== Photograph ==
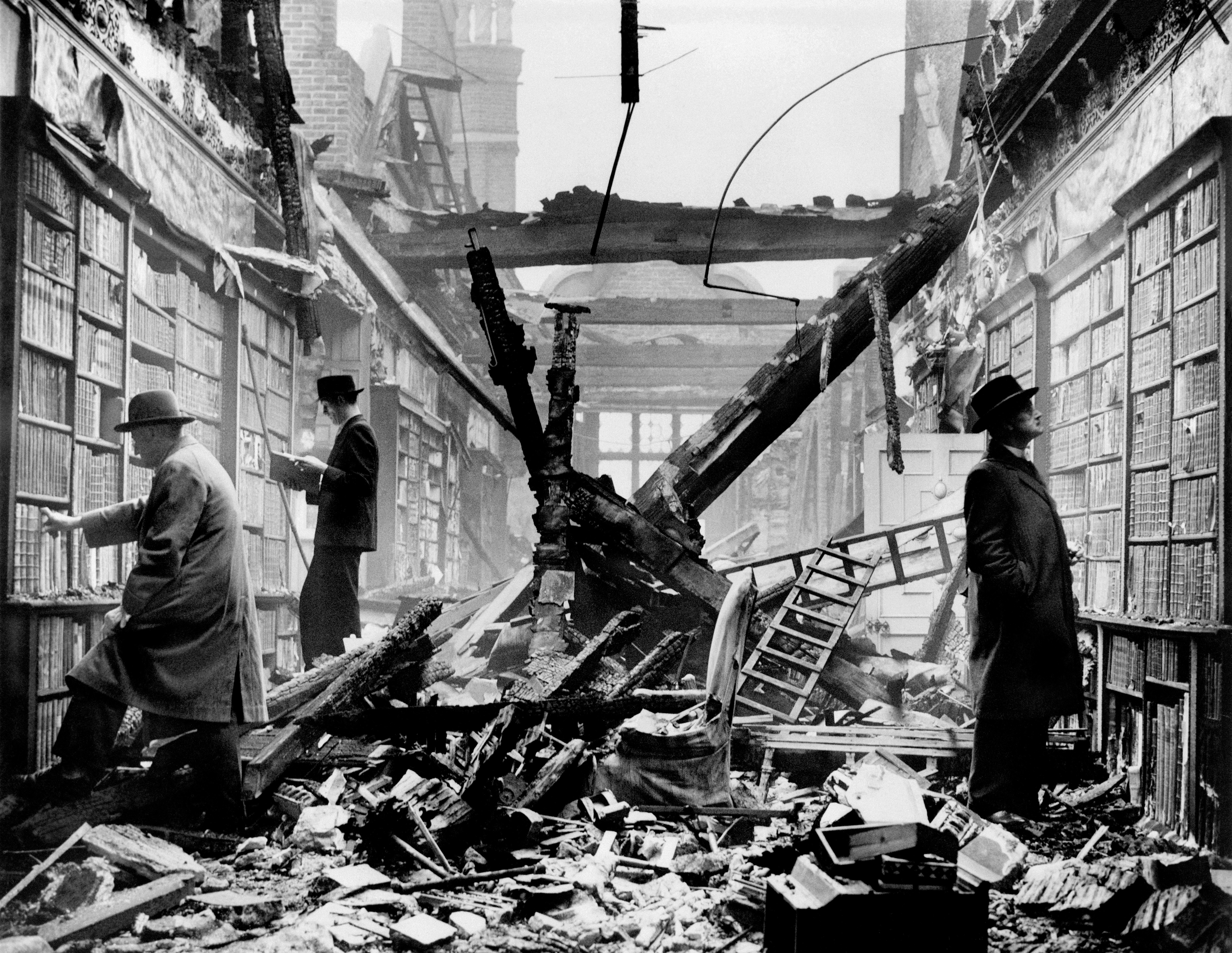
Damaged Library (1940)

Photographer Fred Morley of Fox Photos captured the image of Holborn, Central London, on 9 October 1940, in the aftermath of the 32nd consecutive day of bombing raids during the Blitz. St Paul's Cathedral suffered the first of its wartime bombings during this same bombing raid.

Due to wartime censorship rules, it was unlikely that the British government would allow such a photo to be published, as it was believed such images would damage morale. Censors wanted to prevent the Germans from knowing where the bombs had reached their targets. They also believed that such photos had the potential to contribute to public panic and dismay. The only way Morley could get past the censors to document the bombing, writes photography curator Roger Hargreaves, was by creating "a more palatable fiction".

British historian Lucy Worsley notes that Morley decided to use his assistant to portray a milkman walking seemingly unperturbed through the ruins of London. He borrowed a milkman's uniform and accessories and dressed his assistant in the clothes and had him walk through the scene as he captured the photo. "His strategy to get such a picture published", writes McArdle, "was to play on the British 'stiff upper lip' cliché that would appeal to the censors; show that life was going to carry on as normal, a formula he and other press photographers continued to employ".

The censors saw the milkman representing the "Blitz Spirit", the strength and resolve of the British people in the face of great suffering and destruction, and allowed newspapers to publish the photo on October 10. In 2011, British journalist David Hayes stated that the photograph first became widely known when it appeared in the Daily Mirror.

== Exhibitions ==
Delivery After Raid was exhibited several times. It first appeared in the London General exhibition at the Hulton Getty Picture Gallery in 1999. From July to October 2007, the National Portrait Gallery held the Daily Encounters exhibition, which featured Delivery After Raid along with other press photographs from Fleet Street taken from the early 1900s to the 1980s.

== Interpretation ==
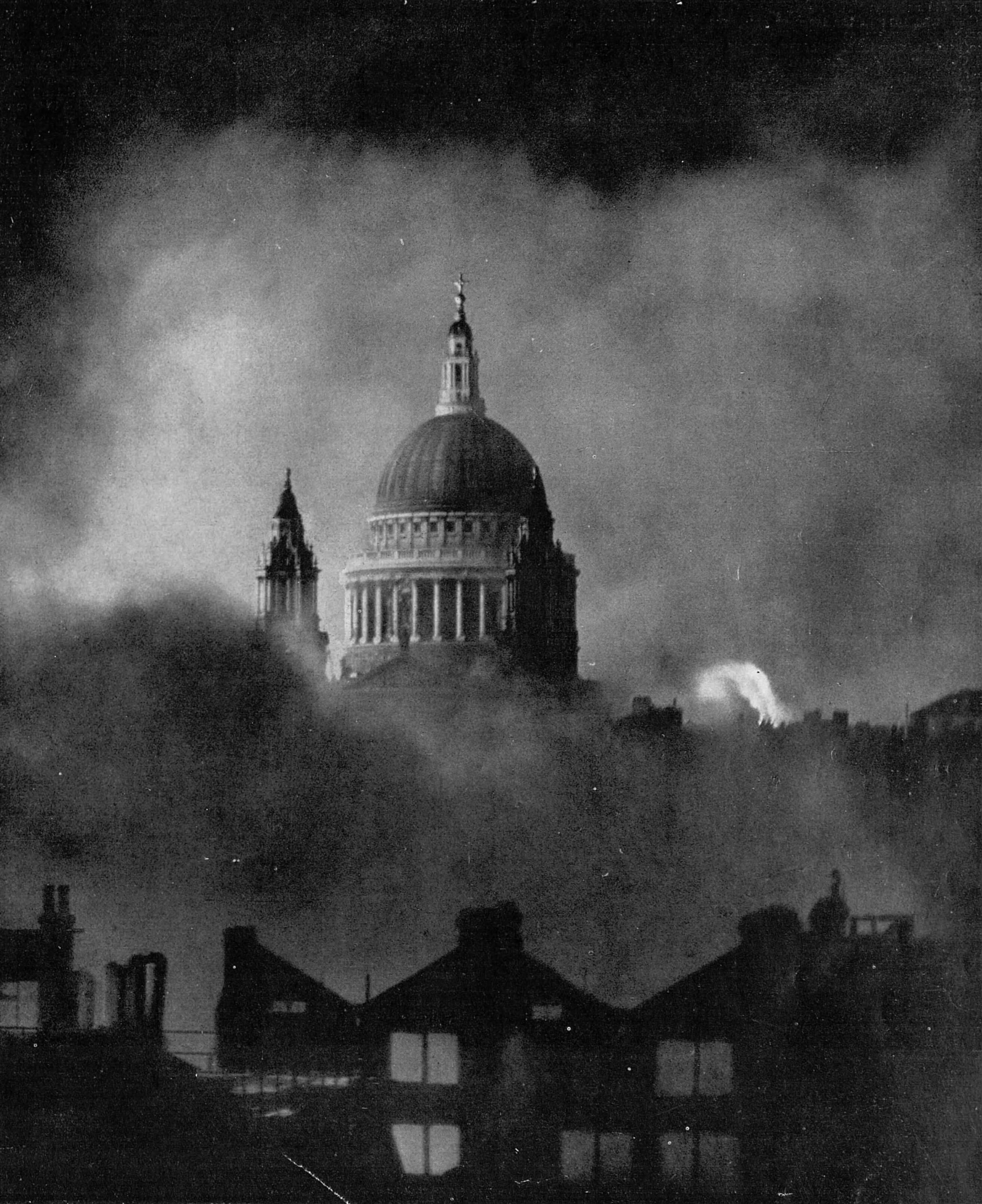
St Paul's Survives (1940)

American historian David F. Crew believes the image of Delivery After Raid is part of a larger set of British photographs taken during World War II that symbolically represents the steadfast resolve of the British people in the face of an incessant and devastating bombing campaign by Nazi Germany. Crew believes these images informed the stoic myth of the Blitz spirit, helping the British people to survive and emerge triumphant in their battle against Germany.

The photo is often discussed as part of a set of two, three, or more similarly contrived and modified photos from the late 1940 Blitz era. (Note: David Hayes discusses two in the set: "The photo [St Paul's Survives] often features today – in books, exhibitions and media stories – in the company of an equally iconic shot taken by Fred Morley [Delivery After Raid]..." James McArdle focuses on multiple images, highlighting Delivery After Raid, Mail As Usual, among others. He also displays an image of Damaged Library but does not discuss it. Gary Woodward mentions Delivery After Raid and Mail As Usual as two of the "many widely circulated photographs taken in the aftermath of air attacks on London". Delivery After Raid and Damaged Library were selected to represent the year 1940 for the book An Independent Eye, a collaboration between the Hulton Getty Picture Collection and The Independent.) These include several staged images of "postmen" (Note: See Woodward 2015 and McArdle 2017. McArdle implies that Morley was the author of at least one of the famous staged postmen images (including Mail As Usual), describing it as a companion to Delivery After Raid. However, the Getty Images archive only credits the image to "Fox Photos", with "Stringer" listed in the details.) delivering or picking up mail (Mail as Usual, 11 September 1940), a staged image of "insurance assessors" (Note: See Hudson 1998. They are alternately described as "city gents" by McArdle 2017 and just "readers" by other authors.) examining the damage of the Holland House library (Damaged Library, 23 October 1940), and a retouched image of an attack on St Paul's Cathedral. (St Paul's Survives, 29–30 December 1940).

All three of the staged photos, Delivery After Raid, Mail as Usual, and Damaged Library, are credited to photographers from the Fox Photos press agency, although a later copy of Damaged Library, which was originally taken by a "Mr. Harrison" for Fox Photos, was also credited to Central Press as they helped distribute a copy of the image to British newspapers. The fourth photo, a modified and retouched St Paul's Survives, was taken by Herbert Mason of the Daily Mail.

Architectural historian Petra Seitz notes that, like many Blitz photographs, the scene of destruction depicted in Delivery After Raid is difficult to identify in the streets of modern London today. The city has transformed over time, writes Seitz, and the passing of the generation who experienced the Blitz has left only photographs to sustain the cultural memory of the war, with the surviving memories reinforcing the myths and forgetting the darker realities of war itself. "Without a clear connection between contemporary and blitztime London", she writes, "it is easy to be swept away by the 'myth of the blitz'".

== See also ==
- Keep Calm and Carry On
- List of photographs considered the most important

== Sources ==
=== Archival collections ===
- Hudson, Roger (1998). An Independent Eye: A Century of Photographs. Sutton Publishing. ISBN 9780750921275. OCLC 607188539.
- McDonald, Sarah (15 October 2004). "Hulton Archive – History In Pictures" (PDF). Getty Images. Archived from the original (PDF) on 27 May 2013.
- Yapp, Nick (2000) [1998]. 1940s: The Hulton Getty Picture Collection. Originally published by Könemann Verlagsgesellschaft mbh. Barnes & Noble Books. ISBN 9783829005210. OCLC 1267615029.

=== Books ===
- Bosman, Suzanne (2008). The National Gallery in Wartime. National Gallery Company; Yale University Press. ISBN 9781857094244. OCLC 223872761.
- Bungay, Stephen (2000). The Most Dangerous Enemy: A History of the Battle of Britain. Aurum Press. ISBN 9781854107213. OCLC 44532870.
- Churchill, Winston (1949). The Second World War. Vol. II: Their Finest Hour. Houghton Mifflin. ISBN 9780395075364. OCLC 396145.
- Cloarec, Nicole (2021). "In-between still and moving pictures: Series and seriality in Stephen Poliakoff's serial drama Shooting the Past (1999)". In Hudelet, Ariane; Crémieux, Anne (eds.). Exploring Seriality on Screen: Audiovisual Narratives in Film and Television. Routledge. pp. 201–202, 210. ISBN 9781003044772. OCLC 1156413367.
- Crew, David F. (2017). Bodies and Ruins: Imagining the Bombing of Germany, 1945 to the Present. University of Michigan Press. ISBN 9780472038466. OCLC 1153662536.
- King, Carol (2017). "Delivery after a Raid". In Lowe, Paul (ed.). 1001 Photographs You Must See in Your Lifetime. New York: Universe Publishing. ISBN 9780789327680. OCLC 974361210.
- Rau, Petra (2009). English Modernism, National Identity and the Germans, 1890–1950. Ashgate. ISBN 9780754656722. OCLC 467178436.
- Rhodes, Anthony (1987). "Britain Improvises, 1936—1945". In Margolin, Victor (ed.). Propaganda, The Art of Persuasion: World War II. Vol. I. Secaucus, NJ: Wellfleet Press. ISBN 1555211712. OCLC 17410005.
- Saint, Andrew (2004). "The Reputation of St Paul's". In Keene, Derek; Burns, Arthur; Saint, Andrew (eds.). St Paul's: The Cathedral Church of London 604–2004. Yale University Press. ISBN 9780300092769. OCLC 54461172.
- Woodward, Guy (2015). Culture, Northern Ireland, and the Second World War. United Kingdom: Oxford University Press. ISBN 9780198716853. OCLC 879567394.

=== Dissertations and theses ===
- McArthur, Jane (2023). Forgotten Images Still Resisting Time: Writing the London Bomb Damage Photograph Archive 1940–1945 (PhD thesis). University of Edinburgh. hdl:1842/41594.
- Seitz, Petra (2020). With Glory Rather Than Gore': V&A Bomb Damage and the Shaping of British War Memory (Master's thesis). Royal College of Art/Victoria and Albert Museum.
- Stater, Brian (1996). 'War's Greatest Picture': St Paul's Cathedral, the London Blitz and British national identity (MSc Report). University College London.
- Streiman, Rebecca (2009). The British Press Agencies Collection At The AGO (Master's thesis). Toronto Metropolitan University. doi:10.32920/ryerson.14645274.v1.

=== Exhibition catalogs ===
- Hargreaves, Roger (2007). Daily Encounters: Photographs from Fleet Street. National Portrait Gallery. ISBN 9781855143777. OCLC 123114667.

=== Films and television ===
- Frank, Emma; Worsley, Lucy (12 November 2021). Blitz Spirit with Lucy Worsley. BBC One. Blakeway. OCLC 9962946780.
- Poliakoff, Stephen (writer and director) (2006). Shooting the Past (Television film / DVD). BBC Video. Distributed by Warner Home Video. ISBN 9781419836725. OCLC 70964562.

=== Journals ===
- Allbeson, Tom (September 2015). "Visualizing Wartime Destruction and Postwar Reconstruction: Herbert Mason's Photograph of St. Paul's Reevaluated". The Journal of Modern History. 87 (3). University of Chicago Press.
- de Burgh, Jane (24 July 1999). "Focusing on London". The Lancet. 354 (9175). ISSN 0140-6736.Full access available to users of The Wikipedia Library.
- Cadava, Eduardo (2001). ""Lapsus Imaginis": The Image in Ruins". October. 96.Full access available to users of The Wikipedia Library.

=== Newspapers ===
- Debusmann Jr., Bernd (5 June 2017). "Nothing can break London's spirit". Khaleej Times.
- Hayes, David (1 November 2011). "The smoke this time". Inside Story.
- Howse, Christopher (September 2010). "Never Mind the Milkman, the Ruins are Real". The Daily Telegraph. Archived from the original on 25 September 2010.
- Levine, Carrie (3 April 1996). "Getty Buys Photo Archive". The Washington Post.
- Marshall, Tyler (2 February 1988). "BBC to Auction Famed Picture Library". Los Angeles Times.
- Marshall, Tyler (17 May 1988). "Entrepreneur Buys British Photo Archive". Los Angeles Times.
- "Obituary: Mr F Morley". Harrow Observer. 31 January 1969.
- Pitman, Joanna (3 July 2007). "Daily Encounters, National Portrait Gallery, WC2". The Sunday Times.
- Sigee, Rachel (23 February 2021). "Blitz Spirit with Lucy Worsley was a long overdue reimagining of 'Britain's finest hour'". The i Paper.
- Steward, Sue (10 July 2007). "History preserved in a flash". Evening Standard.

=== Photographs ===
- "Collection: Photograph of bombed library in Holland House, Kensington (FOX02)". Historic England. National Monuments Record. Historic England Archive. 1946. "The image was taken by Mr. Harrison for Fox Photos. The print has stamps on the reverse of Fox Photos including one certified by government censor."
- Cross, Arthur; Tibbs, Fred (10 October 1940). "St. Paul's Cathedral". The London Archives. "St. Paul's Cathedral : high explosive bomb, 6am, 10th October 1940. General view of the High Altar, showing where the bomb struck the eastern end of the roof, from which masonry fell upon the High Altar."
- "Damaged Library". Central Press/Hulton Archive/Getty Images. Getty Images. 23 October 1940. "The library at Holland House in Kensington, London, extensively damaged by a Molotov 'Breadbasket' fire bomb, 23rd October 1940."
- "Mail As usual". Fox Photos/Getty Images. Getty Images. 11 September 1940. "A postman collecting mail from a post box surrounded by bomb damage in the Old Kent Road, London."
- Mason, Herbert (29–30 December 1940). "St Paul's Survives". The Hyman Collection.
- Morley, Fred (9 October 1940). "Delivery After Raid". Fred Morley/Fox Photos/Hulton Archive/Getty Images. Getty Images. "A milkman delivering milk in a street, devastated in a German bombing raid, in the Holborn area of London, 9th October 1940. Firemen are dampening down the ruins behind him."

=== Websites ===
- McArdle, James M. (9 October 2017). "October 9: Fake". On This Date in Photography.
- McArthur, Jane (15 August 2017). "Addressing the 'Myth of the Blitz'". Imperial War Museum.
