= St Paul's Survives =

1940 photograph of St Paul's Cathedral during The Blitz

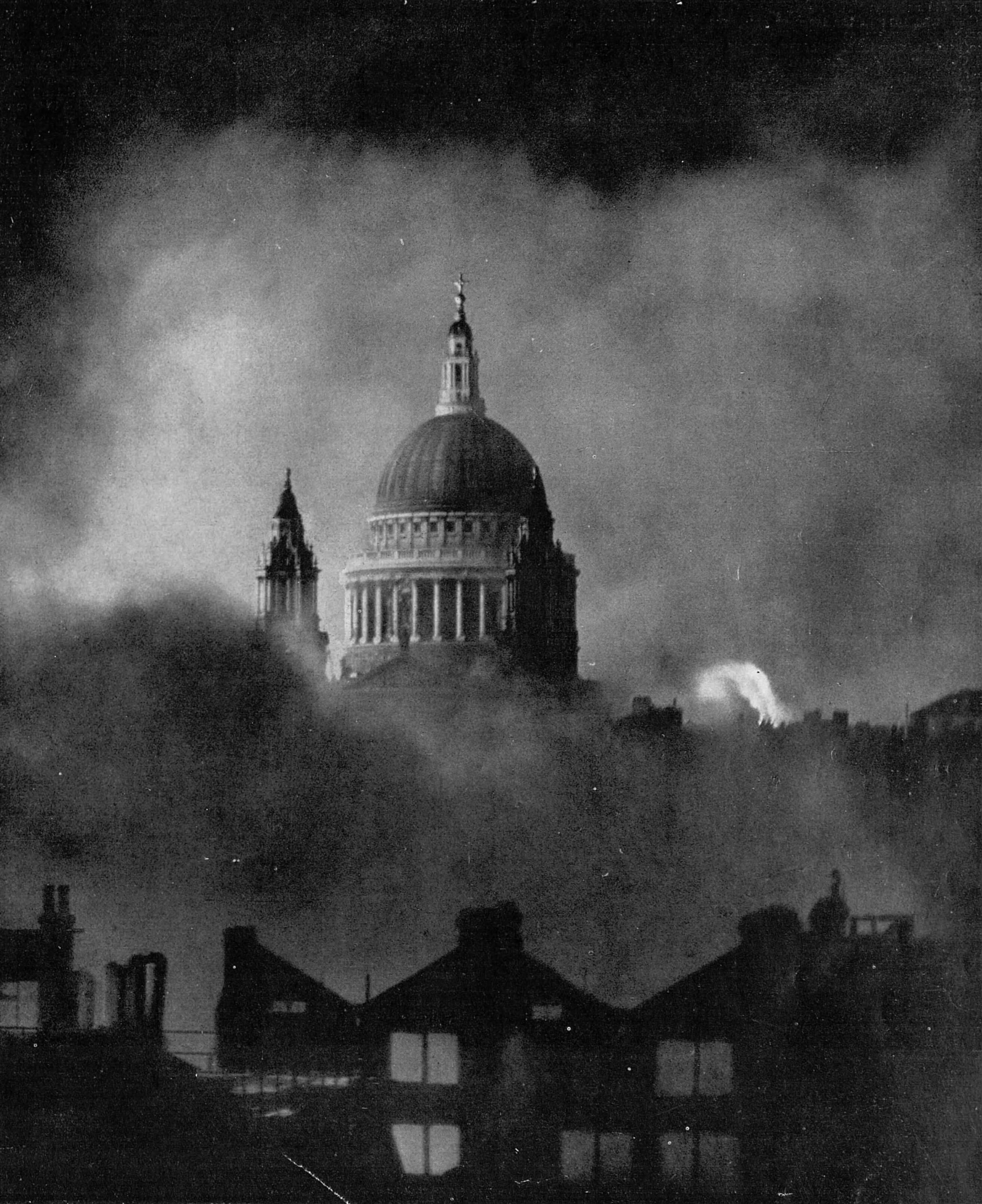
St Paul's Survives: Herbert Mason's photograph of St Paul's Cathedral taken on 29/30 December 1940

St Paul's Survives is a photograph taken in London during the night air raid of 29–30 December 1940, the 114th night of the Blitz of World War II. It shows St Paul's Cathedral, illuminated by fires and surrounded by the smoke of burning buildings. It was taken by photographer Herbert Mason (Note: Not to be confused with an identically named film director. Mason (1903–1964) was a photographer working for Associated Newspapers; he later became an official photographer for the Admiralty. Allbeson 2015, p. 532) in the early hours of 30 December, from the roof of Northcliffe House, the offices of the Daily Mail newspaper, on Tudor Street, close to Fleet Street.

The photograph has become a symbol of British resilience and courage, and is considered one of the iconic images of the Blitz. It became "instantly famous", and turned the Cathedral into "a symbol of togetherness, survival and suffering". The raid during which the photograph was shot became known as the "Second Great Fire of London": more than 160 people died, over 500 were injured, and hundreds of buildings were destroyed.

== The Blitz ==
The Blitz (shortened from German Blitzkrieg 'lightning war') was the sustained strategic bombing of Great Britain and Northern Ireland by Nazi Germany between 7 September 1940 and 10 May 1941, during the Second World War. London, the United Kingdom's capital city, was bombed by the Luftwaffe for 57 consecutive nights. More than one million London houses were destroyed or damaged, and more than 40,000 civilians were killed, half of them in London.

When the picture was taken, almost every building immediately around St Paul's had burned down, with the cathedral surviving in a wasteland of destruction. Its survival was mainly due to the efforts of a special group of firewatchers who were urged by prime minister Winston Churchill to protect the cathedral. Twenty-nine incendiaries fell on and around the cathedral, with one burning through the lead dome and threatening to fall into the dome's wooden support beams. Members of the volunteer St Paul's Watch would have had to climb through the rafters to have any chance of putting it out, but the bomb fell outwards from the roof onto the Stone Gallery, where it was quickly extinguished.

== The picture ==
The cover of Berliner Illustrierte Zeitung, which published this image in its January 1941 issue as proof that the German bombing campaign was working

The picture was taken on 29/30 December 1940, the 114th night of the Blitz. The Daily Mail's chief photographer Herbert Mason was firewatching on top of the roof of his newspaper's building, Northcliffe House, in Tudor Street, off Fleet Street. German bombs destroyed hundreds of buildings that night and thick black smoke filled the air. Mason wanted to get a clear shot of St Paul's and waited hours for the smoke to clear sufficiently. Mason took at least three photographs that night, probably on a quarter-plate Van Neck press camera.

Having been taken in the early hours of Monday morning, the photograph was cleared for publication by the censors to appear in the Daily Mail of Tuesday 31 December 1940. It became the main feature on the front page, with a caption reading "War's Greatest Picture". The image was cropped to omit many of the damaged buildings. The Mail also took the unusual step of publishing the photographer's account of how he took the picture:

I focused at intervals as the great dome loomed up through the smoke. Glares of many fires and sweeping clouds of smoke kept hiding the shape. Then a wind sprang up. Suddenly, the shining cross, dome and towers stood out like a symbol in the inferno. The scene was unbelievable. In that moment or two I released my shutter.

— Herbert Mason

However, Mason's account should not necessarily be taken at face value. A detailed study by Brian Stater has shown that the final image was heavily retouched in the studio: "more of the picture has been changed than not". The original negative has been lost, and there are no surviving prints taken directly from it, but the copy printed in the Daily Mail is known to have been heavily cropped to remove some of the buildings surrounding it, and retouched with paint. The Imperial War Museum holds a larger copy of the print, (Note: The print is held by the IWM as HU 36220A, from the Ministry of Information press agency print collections.) showing the material that was cropped, but this itself is still heavily retouched.

== See also ==
- Damaged Library
- Delivery After Raid
