= Second Great Fire of London =

Air raid by Germany against London 29–30 December 1940

- Part of the Blitz
- Location: 51.51°N 0.09°W; London, England
- Date: 29–30 December 1940; 6:15 pm – 4:00 am (UTC+00:00)
- Target: City of London
- Attack type: Air raid
- Deaths: 160
- Injuries: 250
- Perpetrator: Luftwaffe

The Second Great Fire of London in December 1940 was caused by one of the most destructive air raids of the Blitz during World War II. The Luftwaffe raid caused fires over an area greater than that of the Great Fire of London in 1666, leading one American correspondent to say in a cable to his office that "The second Great Fire of London has begun". Fires started by the raid included an incendiary bomb that broke through the dome of St Paul's Cathedral, which was being guarded by a fire watch team at the behest of Prime Minister Winston Churchill.

== Attack ==
On the night of 29–30 December 1940, approximately 100,000 (mostly small incendiary) bombs fell on the city. The Germans dispatched 136 bombers to the city. Fewer incendiaries were dropped than in the raids of 15 November or 8 December. The raid was focused on a part of the city that contained many non-residential buildings, such as churches, offices, and warehouses. Many of these were locked and were not covered by the Fire Watchers Order of September 1940, which applied to places of work with at least 30 employees, warehouses with a volume of 50,000 cubic feet (1,400 m^{3}) and sawmills or timber yards with more than 50,000 cubic feet of timber.

Incendiary bombs were the main armament that night. Moderately small, at 12 by 3 inches (30 cm × 8 cm)—each bomber was equipped with approximately 180 of them—the bombs carried magnesium and started fires. The raid saw 1,500 fires begin in the city.

== Firefighting ==
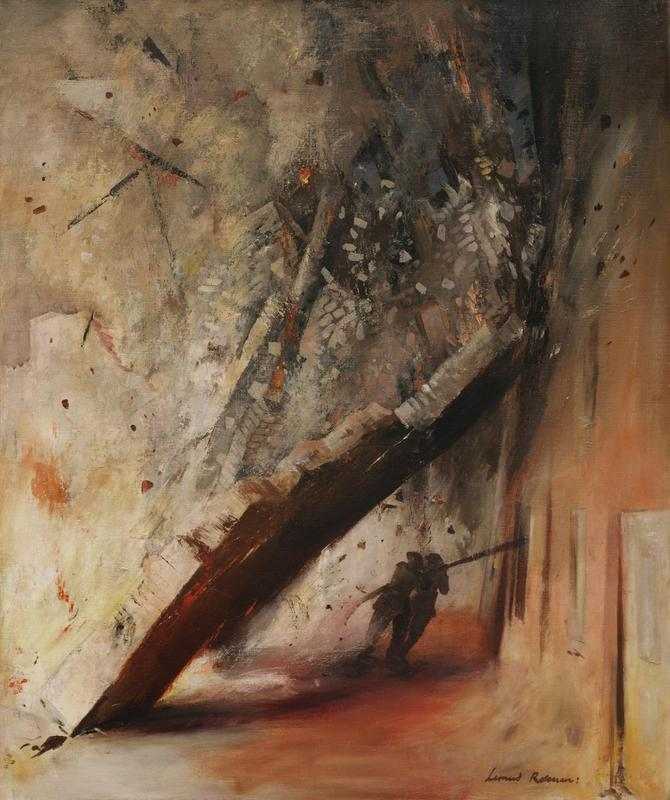
A House Collapsing on Two Firemen, Shoe Lane, London, EC4, a 1940 painting by Leonard Rosoman

Firefighters' efforts were hampered by a water shortage. The primary water-main in the City was bomb-fractured. Units trying to get water from other hydrants caused the water pressure to drop. Efforts to draw water from the River Thames were hampered by the low tide. The fire brigade's difficulties were further exacerbated by wind, combined with the concentrated area of the attack.

Twelve of the 160 people killed in the raid were firefighters, while 250 were injured.

Artist Leonard Rosoman was serving with the Auxiliary Fire Service on the night of the raid. While fighting a fire in Shoe Lane, Rosoman was relieved of his hose. Moments later a wall collapsed, burying the two firefighters working where Rosoman had just been. The moment haunted Rosoman for the rest of his life. He immortalised the scene in his painting A House Collapsing on Two Firemen, Shoe Lane, London, EC4. William Sansom, a friend of Rosoman's who would go on to become a novelist and travel writer, survived the incident. The fireman who relieved Rosoman of his hose was killed.

Sam Chauveau of the London Fire Brigade described the scene that faced the fire fighters:

By the time we finished tackling the fires on the roof of the [Stock] Exchange, the sky, which was ebony black when we first got up there, was now changing to a yellowy orange colour. It looked like there was an enormous circle of fire, including St Paul's churchyard.

== St Paul's Cathedral ==
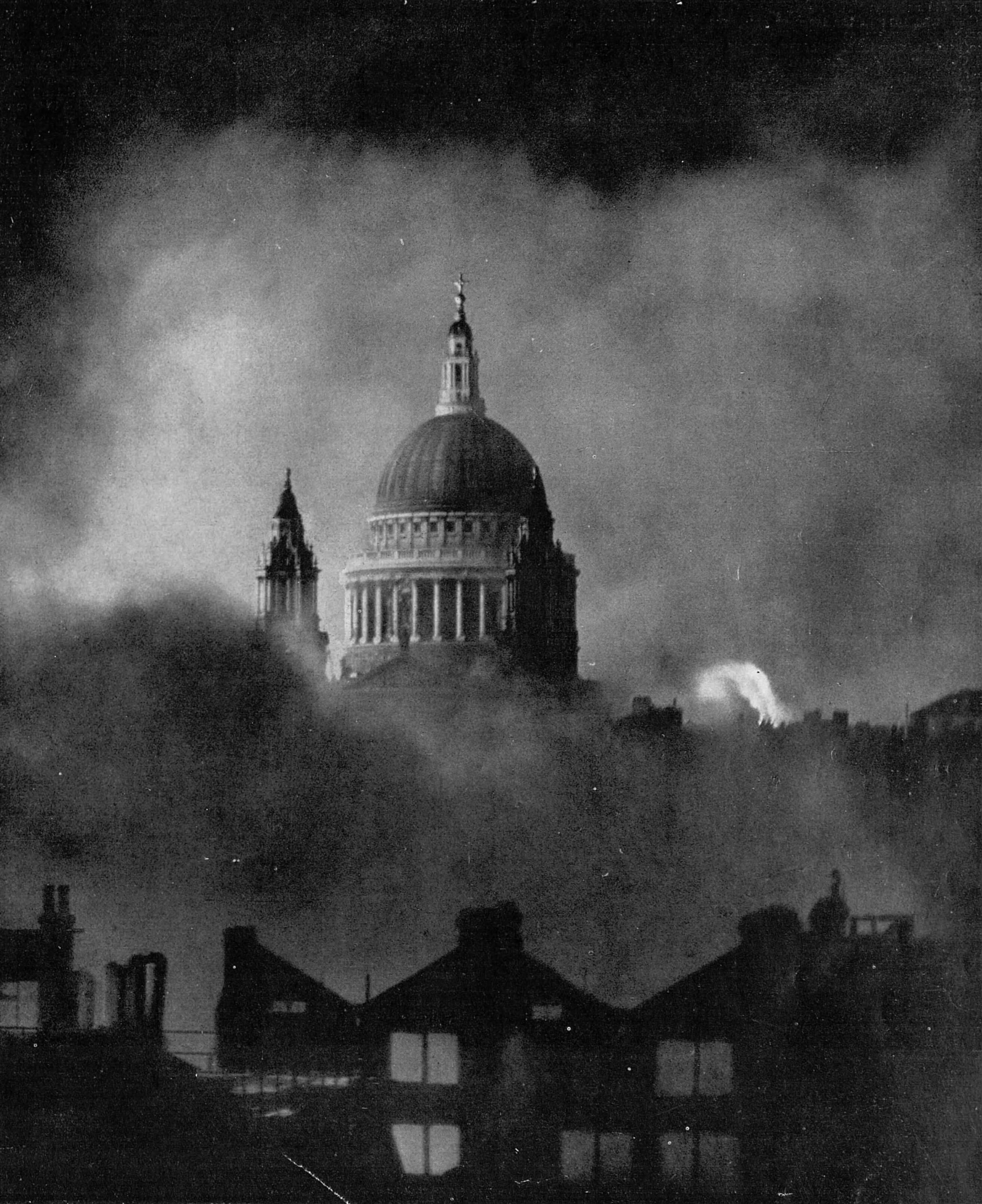
St Paul's Survives: Herbert Mason's photograph of St Paul's Cathedral taken on 29/30 December 1940

St Paul's Cathedral and the immediate area was struck by 28 incendiary bombs. Prime Minister Winston Churchill sent the message that "St Paul's must be saved at all costs".

A famous photograph, St Paul's Survives, was taken from the roof of the Daily Mail building (Northcliffe House on Carmelite Street) by Herbert Mason. Mason was the chief photographer at the Daily Mail, and was on the roof firewatching when he took the picture. Mason described the moment he created the photograph:

I focused at intervals as the great dome loomed up through the smoke... The glare of many fires and sweeping clouds of smoke kept hiding the shape. Then a wind sprang up. Suddenly, the shining cross, dome, and towers stood out like a symbol in the inferno. The scene was unbelievable. In that moment or two, I released my shutter.

The camera is believed to have been a Van Neck on a quarter plate glass negative. The Royal Photographic Society magazine Photographic Journal, remarked on the brightness of the scene, saying that "The light that was available for an instantaneous exposure is an indication of the fierceness and extent of the fire."

Volunteers serving as part of the St Paul's Watch patrolled the iconic building. The Watch was first put together during the First World War. Then it was meant to protect the building from German Zeppelin raids. With the outbreak of the Second World War, the group was reconstituted to guard against the anticipated air raids.

American correspondent Ernie Pyle observed the raid from a balcony:

Into the dark shadowed spaces below us, while we watched, whole batches of incendiary bombs fell. We saw two dozen go off in two seconds. They flashed terrifically, then quickly simmered down to pin points of dazzling white, burning ferociously... The greatest of all the fires was directly in front of us. Flames seemed to whip hundreds of feet into the air. Pinkish-white smoke ballooned upward in a great cloud, and out of this cloud there gradually took shape—so faintly at first that we weren't sure we saw correctly—the gigantic dome of St Paul's Cathedral. St Paul's was surrounded by fire, but it came through. It stood there in its enormous proportions—growing slowly clearer and clearer, the way objects take shape at dawn. It was like a picture of some miraculous figure that appears before peace-hungry soldiers on a battlefield.

== Aftermath ==
The medieval Guildhall and several Christopher Wren churches were among the many historic buildings in the central City of London heavily damaged or destroyed in the attack.

The publishing industry bore heavy losses in the raid. Ave Maria Lane and Paternoster Row, an area known since the 19th century as the centre of the London publishing and book trade, were badly hit, and the buildings and stock of 20 publishing houses were totally or partially destroyed. Stationers' Hall, neighbouring offices, the book wholesalers Simpkin Marshall, and several bookshops were lost. An estimated five million books were lost in the fires caused by tens of thousands of incendiary bombs.
