= Tourism in London =

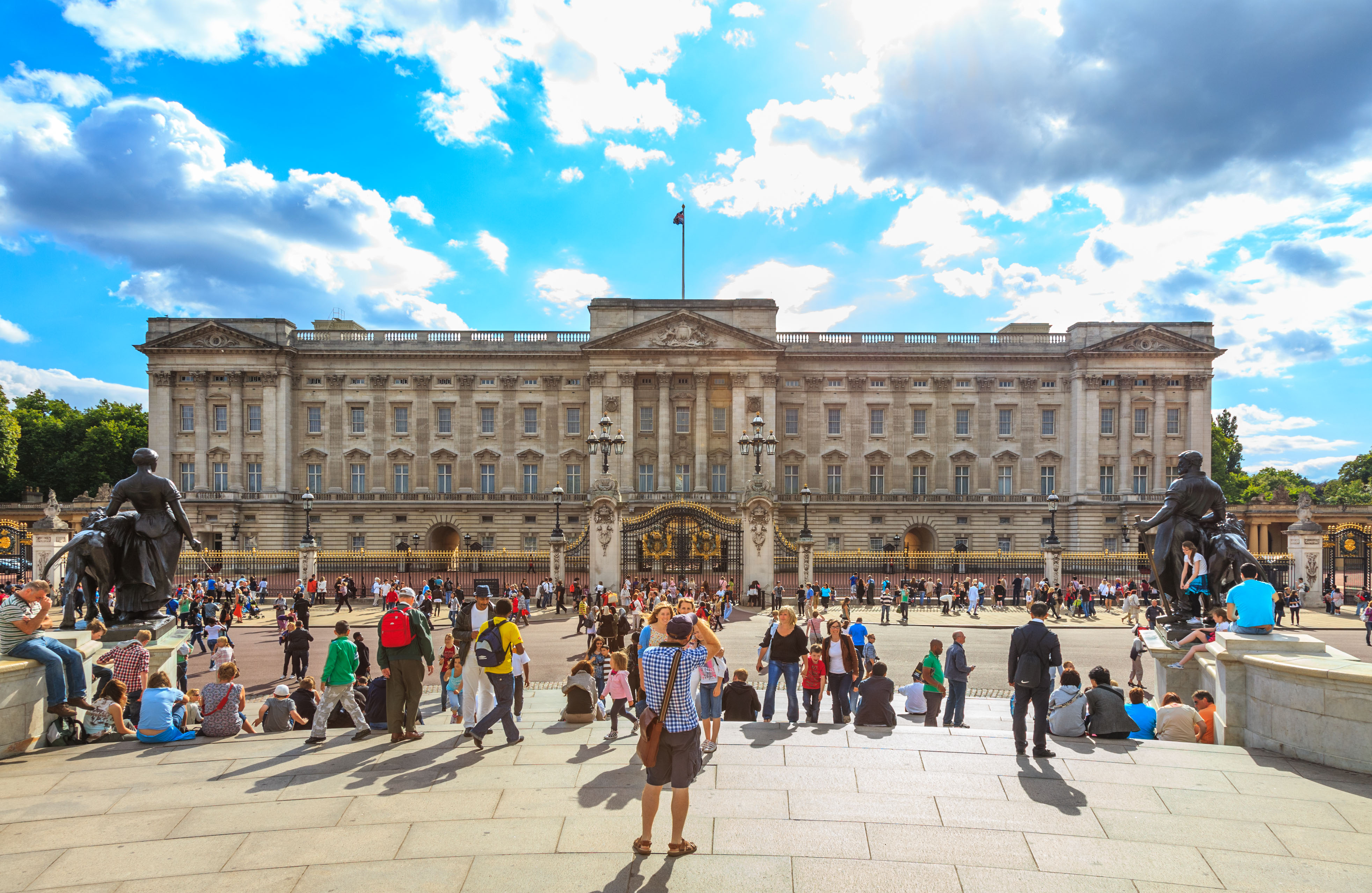
Tourists at Buckingham Palace

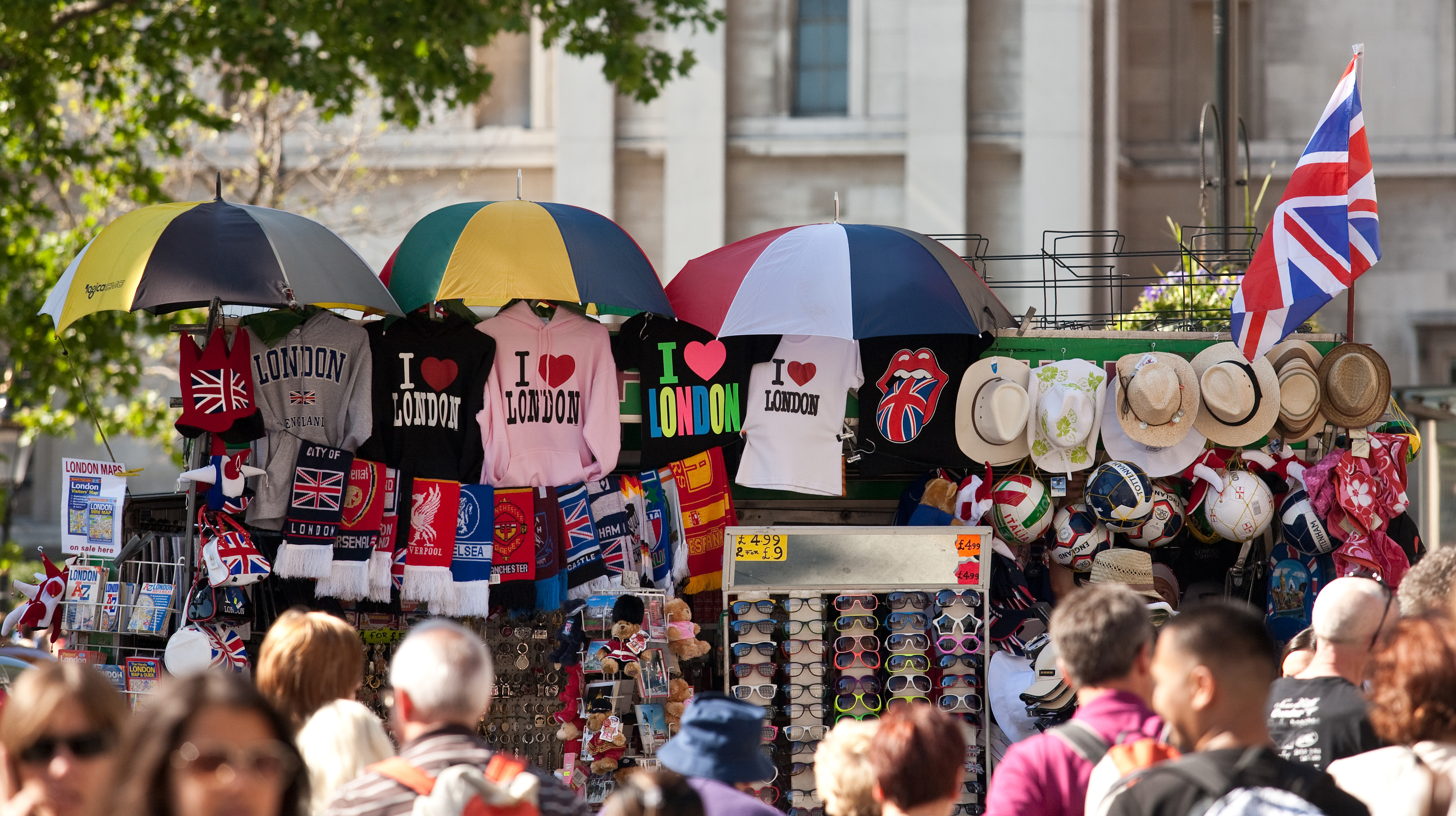
A tourist stall selling various London and United Kingdom related souvenirs on the edge of Trafalgar Square on the Strand

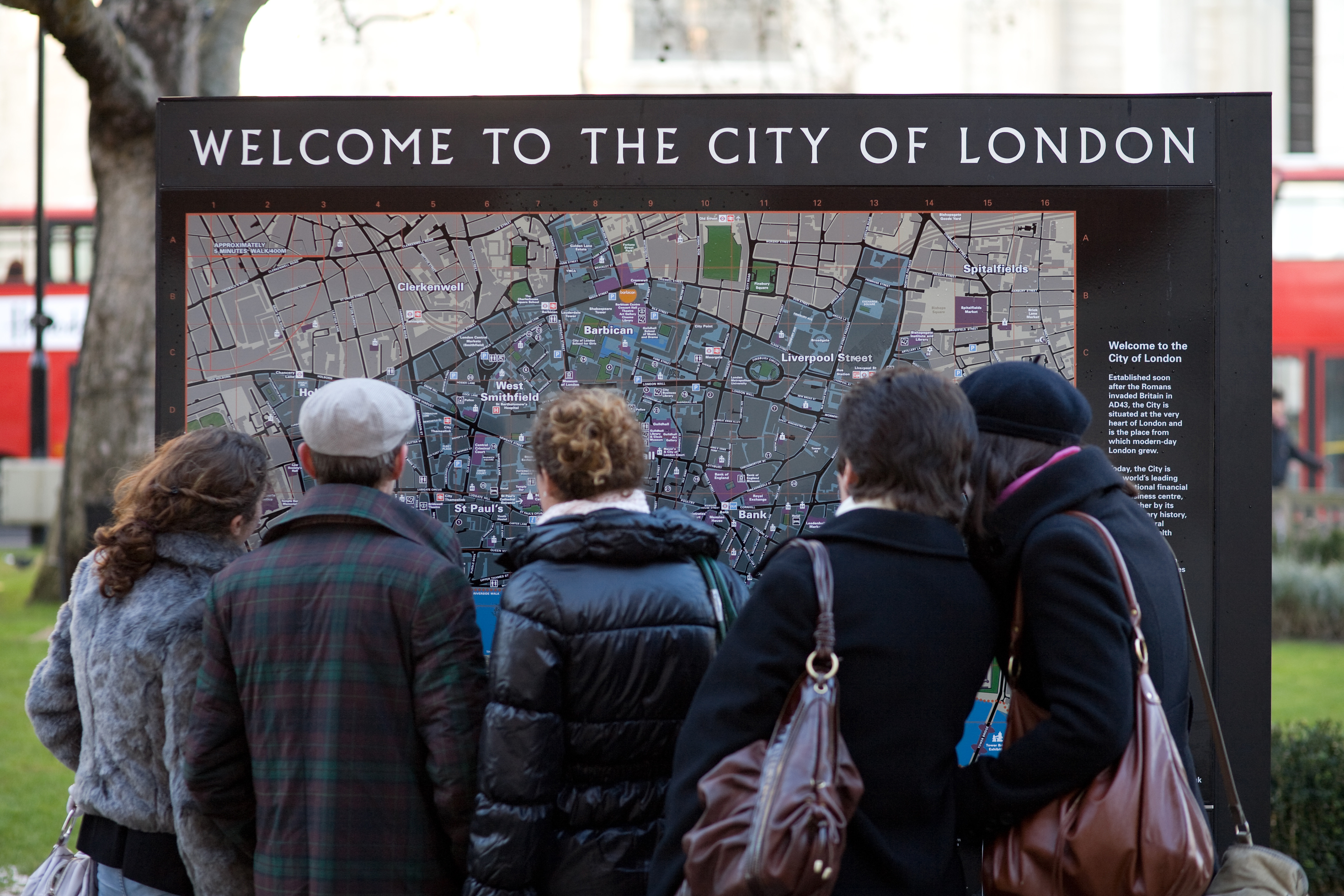
Tourists consulting a map near St Paul's Cathedral

London, the capital city of England, is one of the world's most visited cities in terms of international visits, ranking third in 2024. It is home to an array of notable tourist attractions, attracting 20.3 million overnight visits in 2023, far more than any other town or city and close to the number of visits seen in 2019 (21.7 million).

== Effect on the economy ==
The travel and tourism sector in the United Kingdom contributed GBP66.3 billion to the gross domestic product (GDP), 3.4% of total GDP in 2016 and is expected to rise by 2.2% pa, from 2017 to 2027, to GBP84.6 billion, which could comprise up to 3.6% of the total GDP in 2027.

In 2011, visitors to London spent £9.4 billion, which is a little more than half of the total amount international visitors spent in the whole of the United Kingdom the same year.

A 2013 study by Deloitte and Oxford Economics concluded that the tourism sector employed 700,000 people, accounting for 11.6 per cent of London's GDP.

== Notable attractions ==
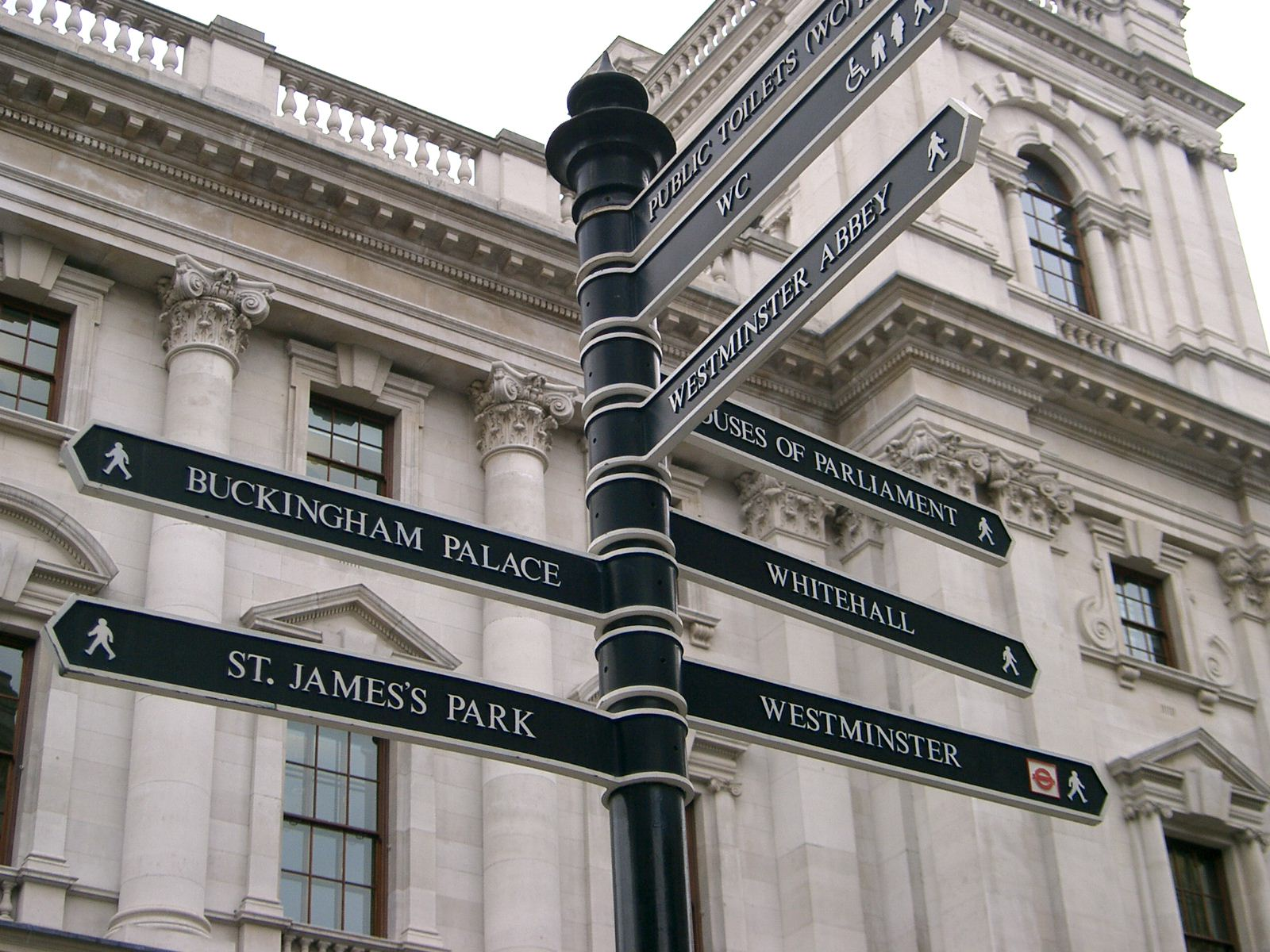
A signpost on Parliament Square with directions for nearby attractions

The London Eye is a giant Ferris wheel located on the edge of the River Thames. It is 135 metres tall and has a diameter of 120 metres. A short walk away, the area is home to the London Aquarium, Elizabeth Tower, the Houses of Parliament, Westminster Abbey and Nelson's Column. In 2013, the tallest building in London, The Shard, opened a viewing platform to the public. Other major tourist attractions in London include the Tower of London, Buckingham Palace (although this is only open to the public during a limited number of months in the summer), Tower Bridge Experience, Madame Tussauds, ZSL London Zoo, London Dungeon and St Paul's Cathedral.

The Association of Leading Visitor Attractions reported that the following were the top 10 visitor attractions in 2017:

- British Museum – 5.9 million visits
- Tate Modern – 5.7 million
- National Gallery – 5.2 million
- Natural History Museum, London – 4.4 million
- Victoria and Albert Museum – 3.7 million
- Science Museum, London – 3.3 million
- Southbank Centre – 3.2 million
- Somerset House – 3.2 million
- Tower of London – 2.8 million
- Royal Museums Greenwich – 2.6 million

London received approximately 20.9 million international visitor arrivals in 2024, up from 20.3 million in 2023, though still slightly below the 2019 peak of about 21.7 million.

== Museums and galleries ==
There are many museums and art galleries in the London area, the majority of which are free to enter. Many of them are popular places for tourism. In addition to Tate Modern and the National Gallery, notable galleries include Tate Britain and the National Portrait Gallery.

== Parks and open spaces ==
London has several parks for tourists to stroll, rest and relax in. They include Hyde Park, Regent's Park, Green Park, St. James's Park, Hampstead Heath and Greenwich Park.

== Economics ==
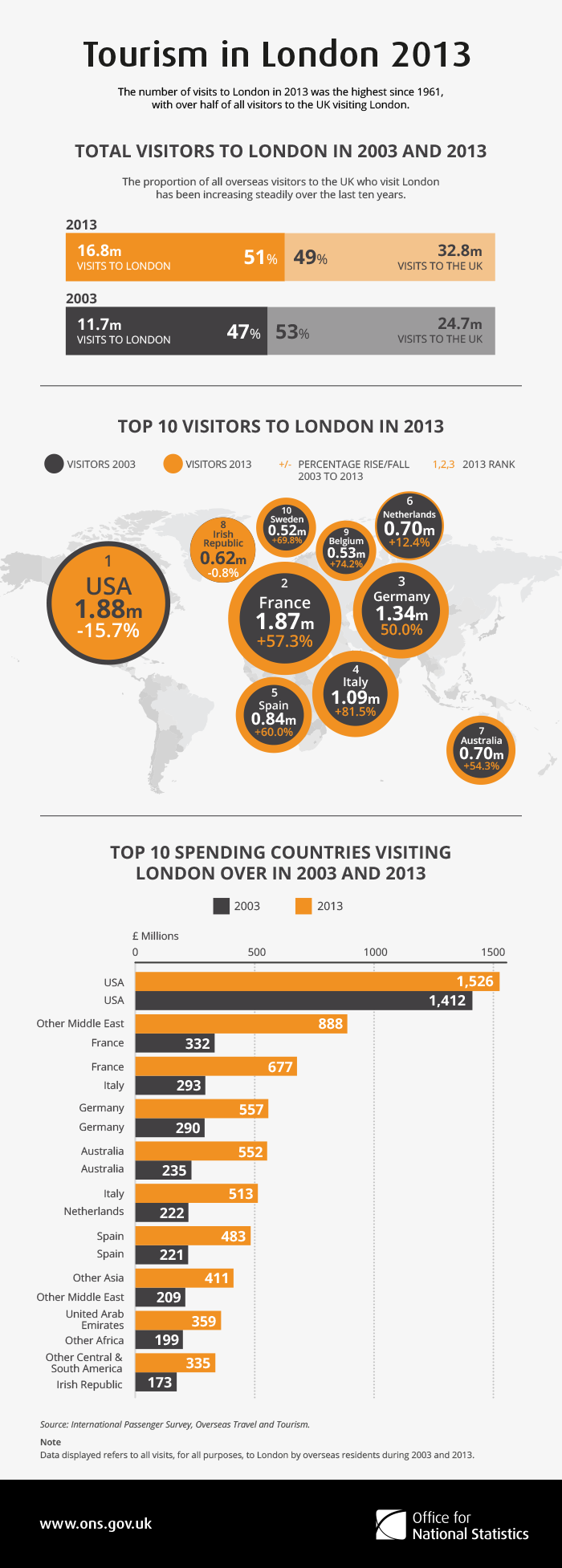
Tourism in London 2013

London attracted 16.8 million foreign visitors in 2013, they accounted for 51.4% of all visitors. Below is the visitors information:

- France 1,904,000
- United States 1,878,000
- Germany 1,295,000
- Italy 1,072,000
- Spain 866,000
- The Netherlands 687,000
- Australia 687,000
- Republic of Ireland 611,000
- Belgium 531,000
- Sweden 516,000

== Public transport ==
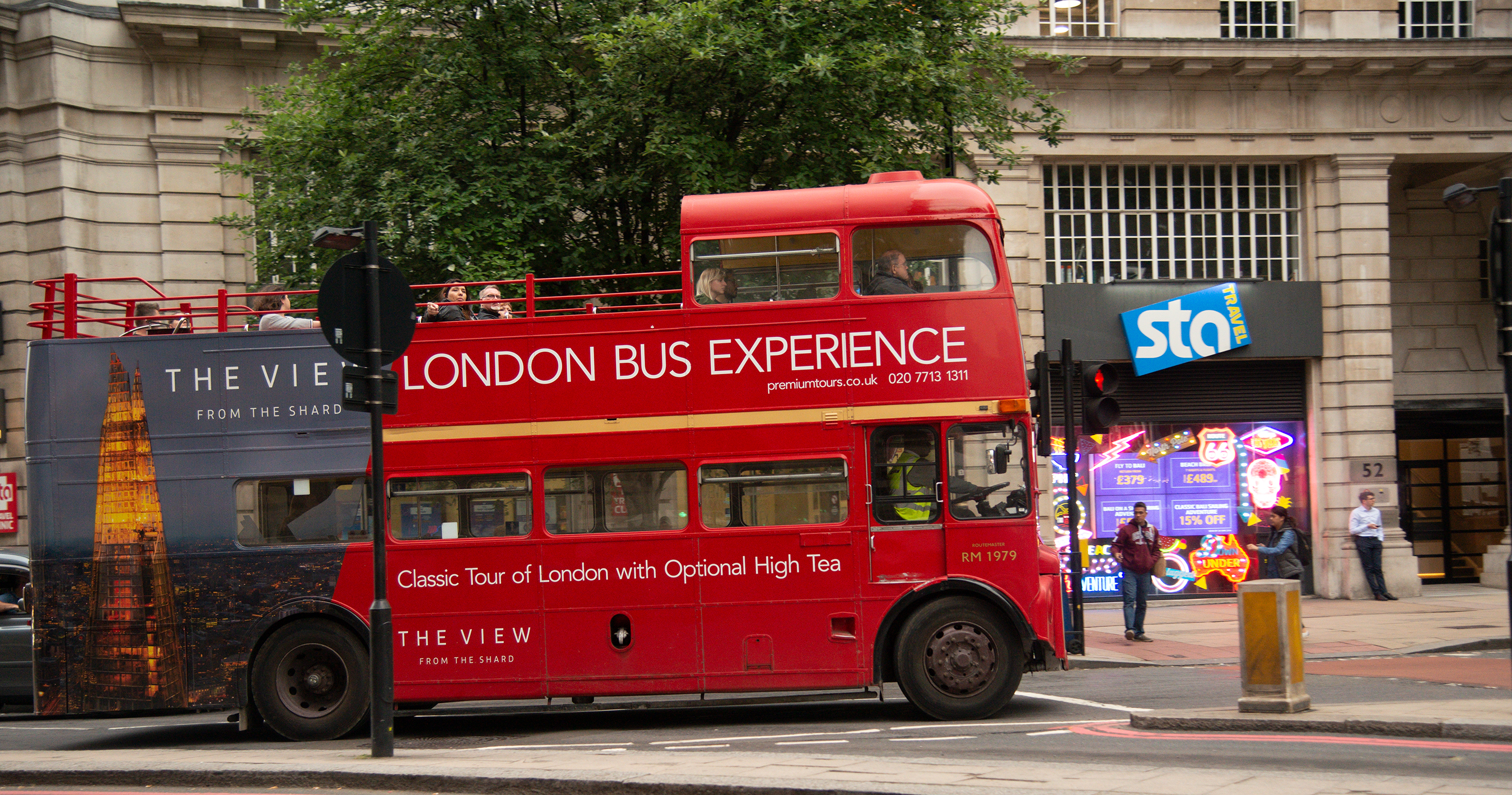
In spite of heavy traffic, several companies operate tour buses in London.

Public transport is essential in conveying tourists to and from attractions, and deciding the means of and cost of their travel. London's transport can also be an attraction in itself. London offers many forms of public transport: the Underground (commonly referred to as the Tube), double-decker red buses, and taxis. Tourists can purchase Travelcards to take the Tube, bus, or overground trains through designated zones.
