= Religion in London =

Religion in London (2021 United Kingdom census)
1. Christian (40.7%)
2. No religion (27.1%)
3. Muslim (15.0%)
4. Hindu (5.10%)
5. Jewish (1.70%)
6. Sikh (1.60%)
7. Buddhist (0.90%)
8. Other religion (1.00%)
9. Not stated (7.00%)

Religious makeup of London in single year age groups in the 2021 census

London was historically an overwhelmingly Christian city, but now Christians form a minority of the population, though Christianity is still the largest religion in London. In the 2021 census, the religious composition of London comprised: 40.7% Christianity, 27.1% No religion, 15.0% Islam, 5.1% Hinduism, 1.7% Judaism, 1.6% Sikhism, 0.9% Buddhism, 1.0% Other religion, and 7.0% Not stated.

The most substantial recent changes in the religious composition of London are the significant decrease in Christianity from 58.2% in the 2001 census to 40.7% in the 2021 census, the significant increase in No religion from 15.8% in the 2001 census to 27.1% in the 2021 census, and the significant increase in Islam from 8.5% in the 2001 census to 15.0% in the 2021 census.

== Censuses ==
The table below shows data regarding religion in London for the 2001, 2011, and 2021 censuses.

Religion in London
| Religion | 2001 Census | 2011 Census | 2021 Census |
|---|---|---|---|
| Christian | 58.2% | 48.4% | 40.7% |
| No religion | 15.8% | 20.7% | 27.1% |
| Muslim | 8.5% | 12.4% | 15.0% |
| Hindu | 4.1% | 5.0% | 5.1% |
| Jewish | 2.1% | 1.8% | 1.7% |
| Sikh | 1.5% | 1.5% | 1.6% |
| Buddhist | 0.8% | 1.0% | 0.9% |
| Other religion | 0.5% | 0.6% | 1.0% |
| Not stated | 8.7% | 8.5% | 7.0% |

== Distribution ==
The distribution of religions in Greater London at the 2011 census.
Christianity

Islam

Hinduism

Judaism

Sikhism

Buddhism

Other religion

No religion

== Christianity ==
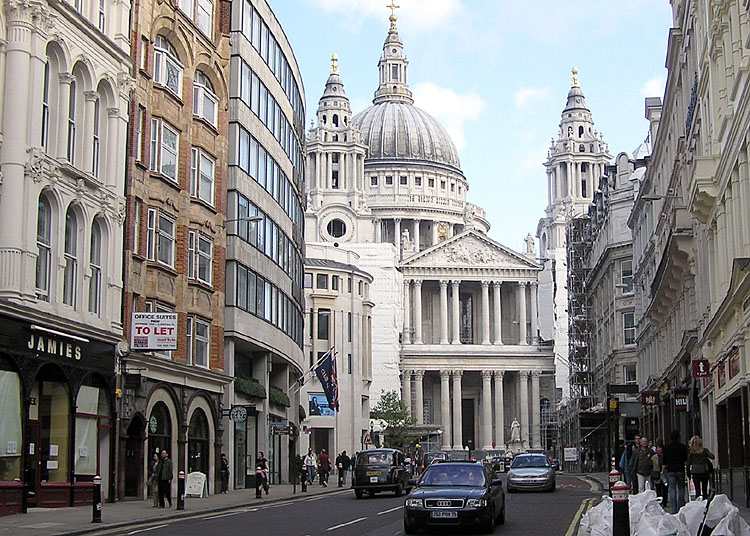
St Paul's Cathedral

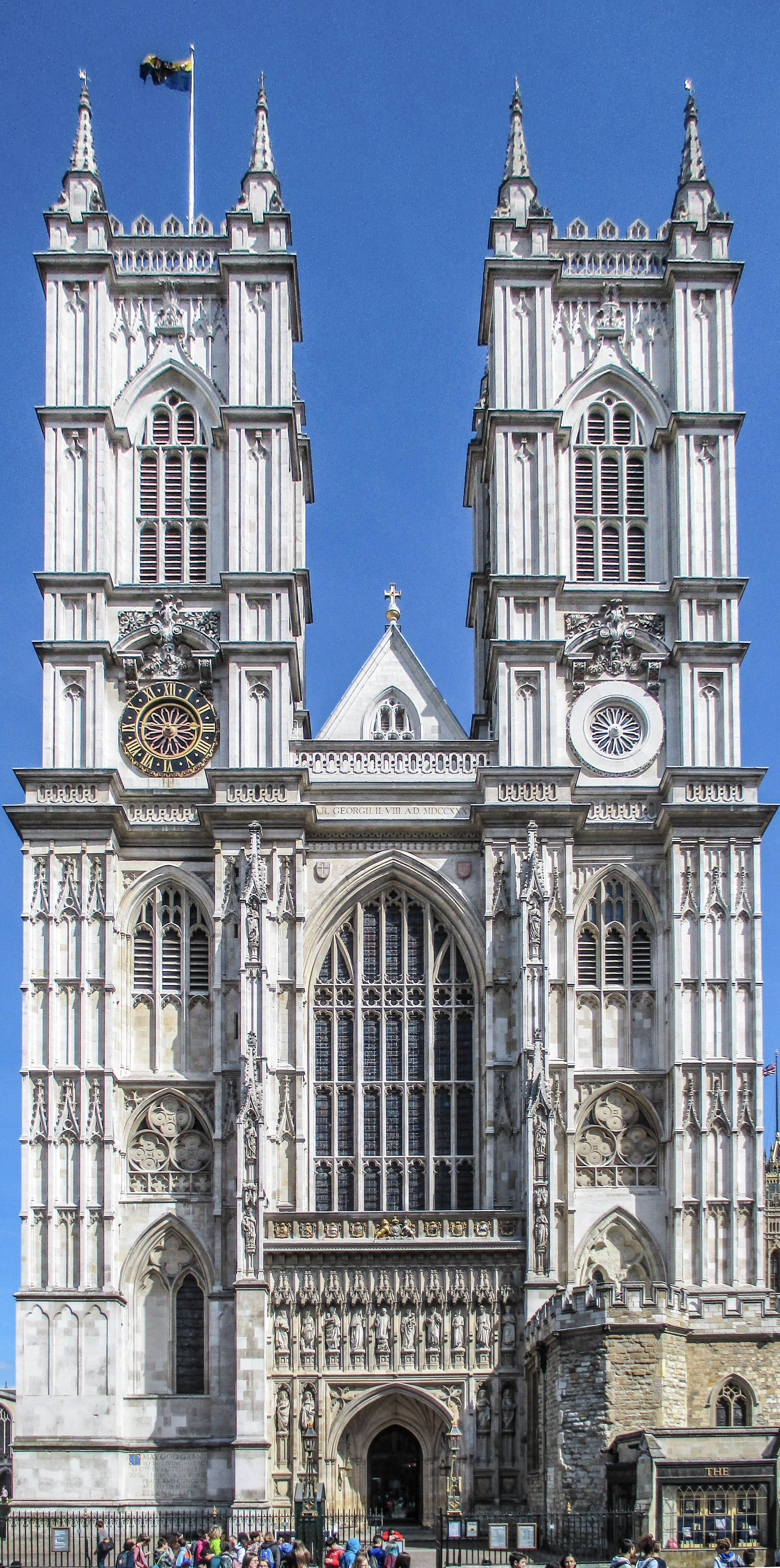
Westminster Abbey, the main Anglican church of London

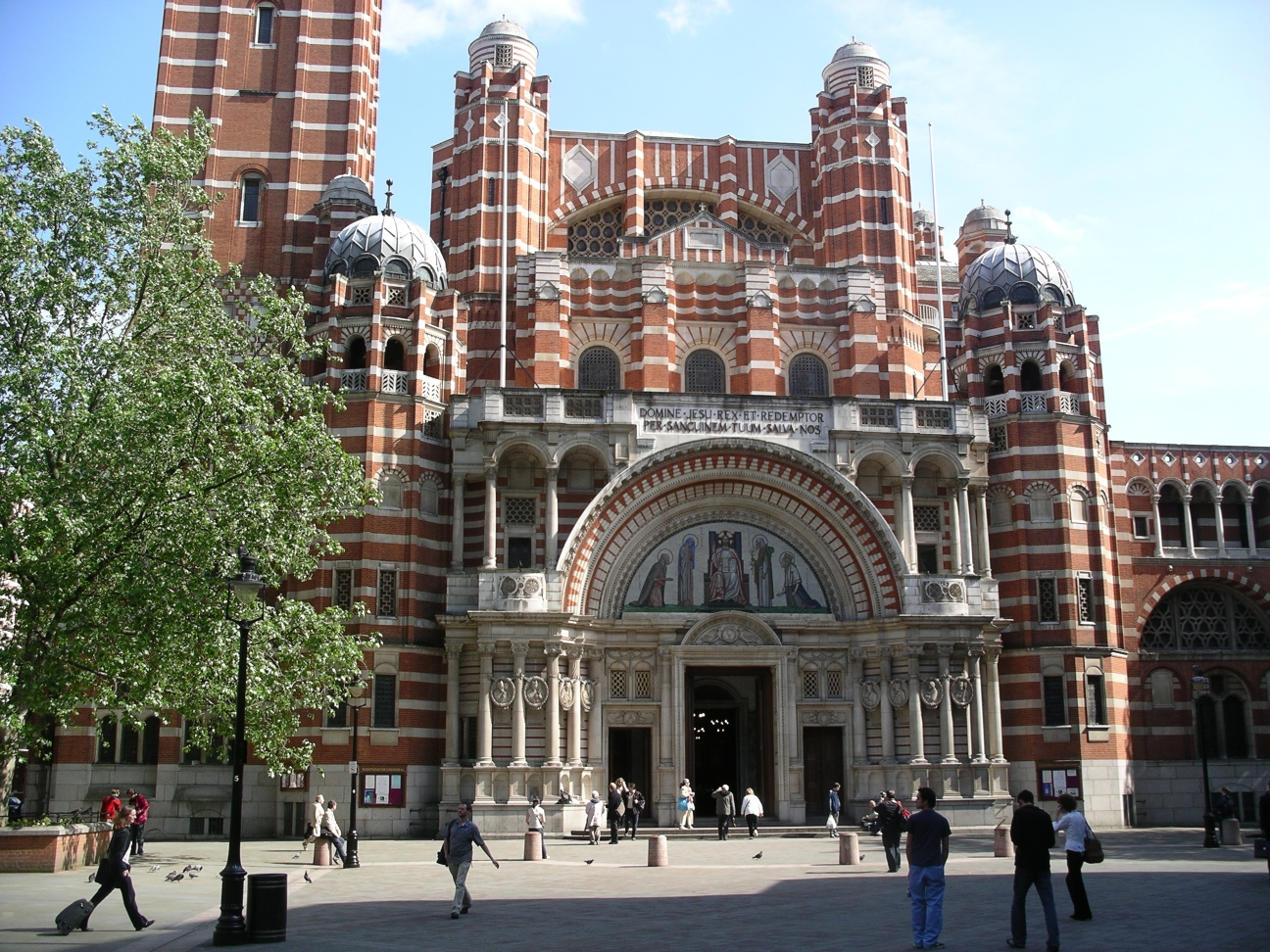
Westminster Cathedral, the main Catholic church of London

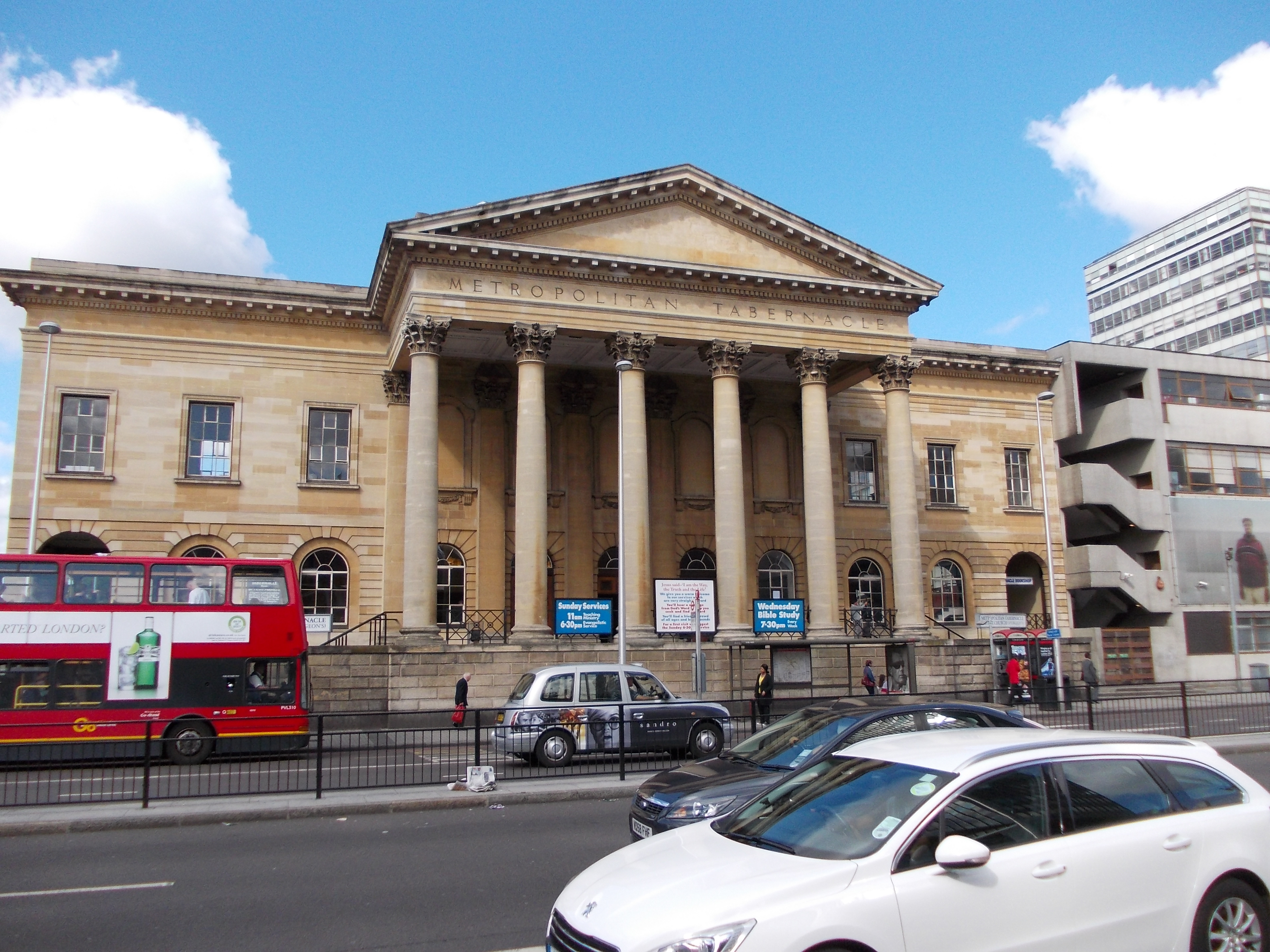
Metropolitan Tabernacle in Elephant and Castle

In a 2020 report, the biggest Christian denomination in London was Catholicism (35% of the Christian population), followed by Anglicanism (33%), Pentecostals (7%), and Orthodox (6%).

The Archbishop of Canterbury's of the Church of England main residence is at Lambeth Palace. Most parts of London north of the River Thames and west of the River Lea are within the diocese of London under the Bishop of London at St Paul's Cathedral in the City. Parishes from the east coast to the Thames are within the Diocese of Chelmsford. Most parts south of the river are administered from Southwark Cathedral as the diocese of Southwark. Important national and royal ceremonies are divided between St Paul's and Westminster Abbey.

The pre-eminent Catholic cathedral in England and Wales is Westminster Cathedral, from which the Archbishop of Westminster leads the English and Welsh Catholic churches. Other Christian denominations have headquarters in London, including the United Reformed Church, the Salvation Army, and the Quakers, and immigrant communities have established their own denominations or dioceses (e.g., the Eastern Orthodox Church). Many evangelical denominations also have church buildings in London.

The largest nonconformist church is the Metropolitan Tabernacle.

The Passion of Jesus in Trafalgar Square takes place each year, and is supported by the Greater London Authority.

== Buddhism ==
There were 77,426 Buddhists reported in the 2021 census in the Greater London area.

The first purpose-built Buddhist temple in the United Kingdom was the Wat Buddhapadipa in Wimbledon. The London Peace Pagoda was offered to London by the Nipponzan Myohoji Buddhist Order as part of the 1984 Greater London Council Peace Year.

== Islam ==
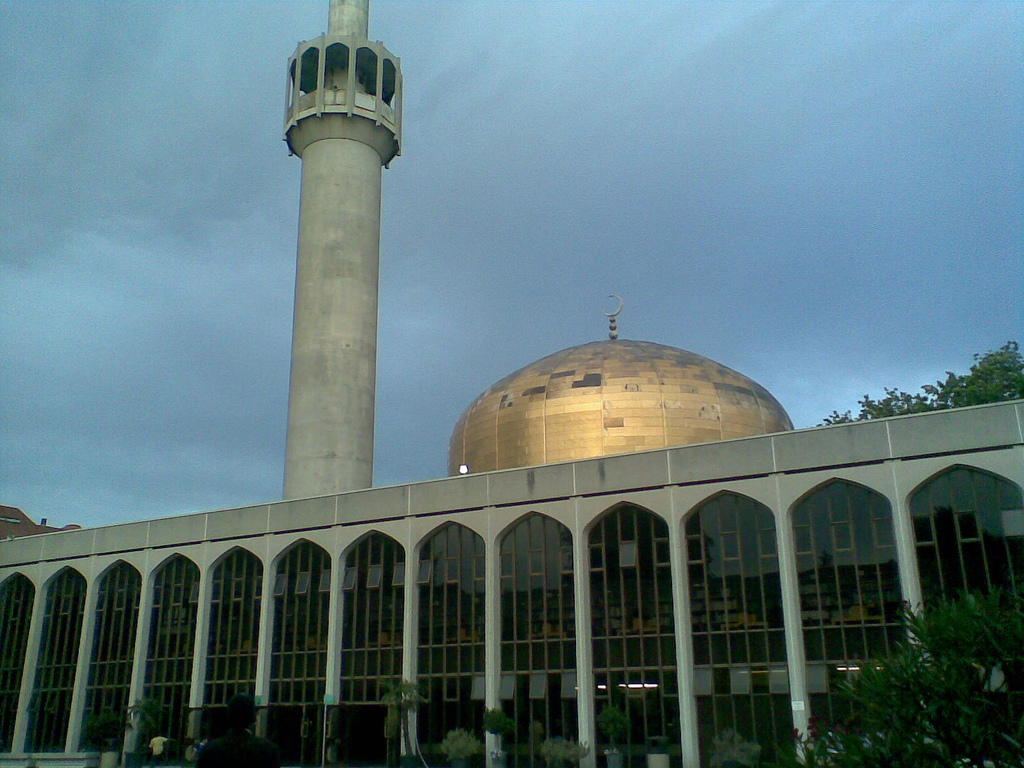
London Central Mosque in Regent’s Park, London.

Islam is London's second-largest religion. Muslims make up 15% of London's population. There were 1,318,755 Muslims reported in the 2021 census in the Greater London area.

In 1895, London's first mosque was established by Mohamad Dollie, in modern-day Camden. The East London Mosque is the largest Muslim centre in Central Europe. London Central Mosque is a locally well-known landmark on the edge of Regent's Park, and there are many other mosques in London.

The celebration of Eid al-Adha in Trafalgar Square, Eid in the Square, is organised by the Greater London Authority.

== Judaism ==
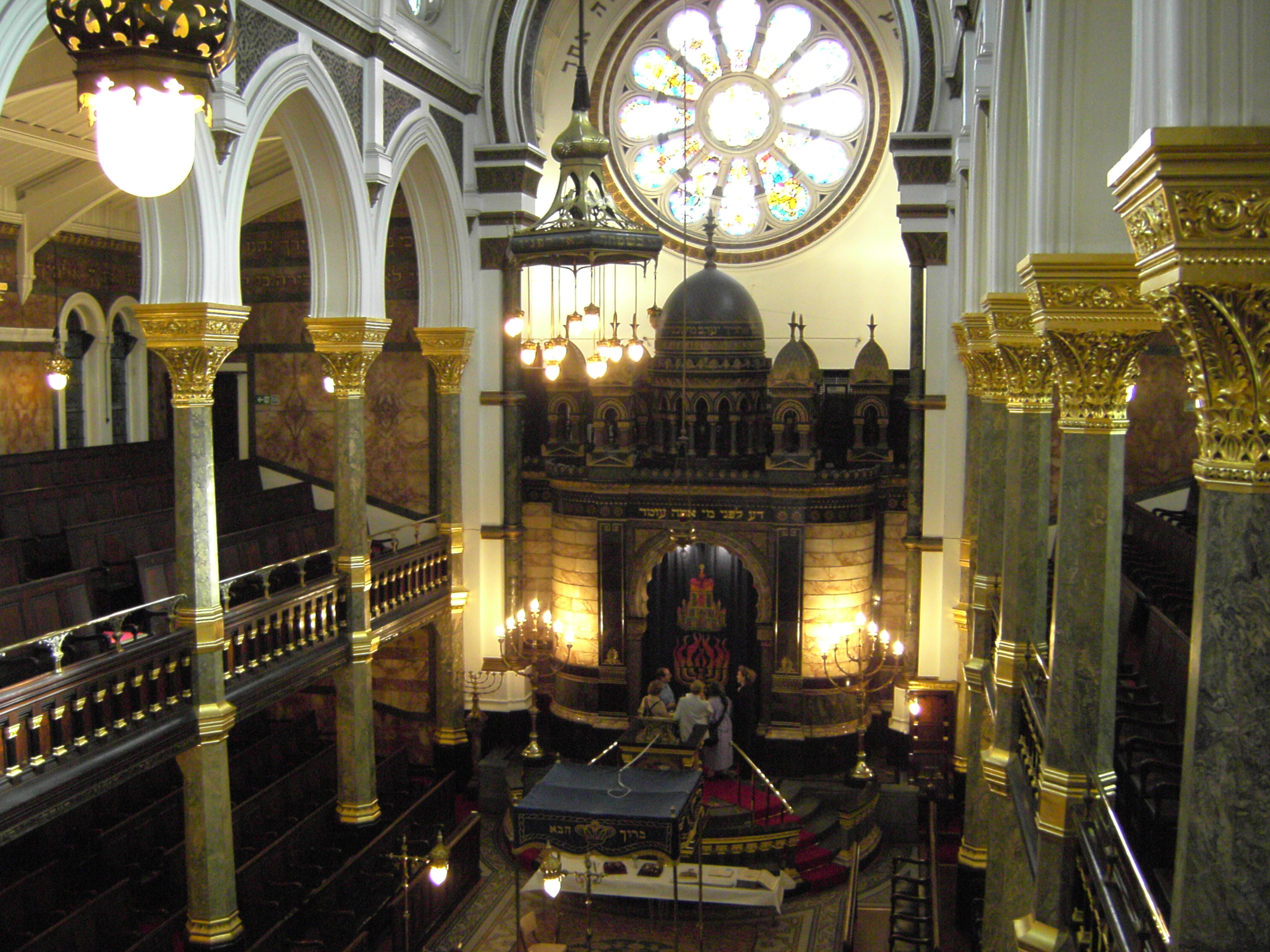
Interior of the New West End Synagogue

Over two-thirds of British Jews live in London, which ranks thirteenth in the world as a Jewish population centre. There are significant Jewish communities in parts of north London such as Stamford Hill and Golders Green. There are currently two eruvin in London; one that covers Hendon, Golders Green, and Hampstead Garden Suburb, and another in Edgware. There are two more planned eruvin: one in Stanmore, and one covering Elstree/Borehamwood.

The first written record of Jewish settlement in London dates from 1070, although Jews may have lived there since Roman times. The Bevis Marks Synagogue, built in 1701 in the City of London, is the oldest synagogue in the United Kingdom still in use. In 1899, a map was published showing, by colour, the proportion of the Jewish population to other residents of East London, street by street. It illustrates clearly the predominantly Jewish population at the time in the areas of Whitechapel, Spitalfields, and Mile End in particular.

The largest Chanukah event in London is Chanukah in the Square, which takes place annually in Trafalgar Square and is organised by the Greater London Authority.

== Hinduism ==
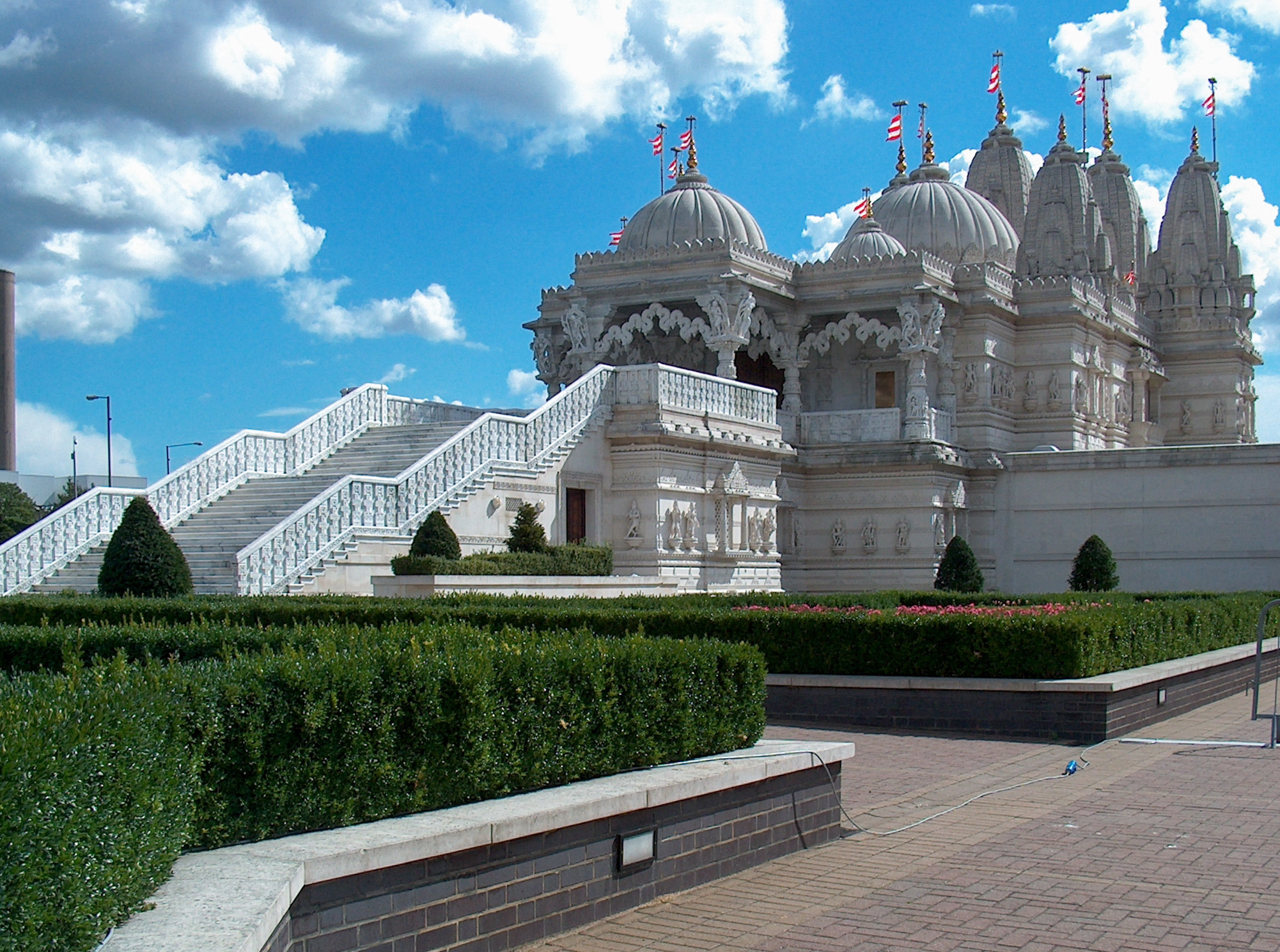
Hindu temple at Neasden, one of the largest temples of Hinduism in Europe

Over half of the UK's Hindu population lives in London, where they make up 5% of the population. British Hindus primarily live in Western London; however, every borough has a significant Hindu population. As per the 2011 census, the London borough of Harrow has the largest concentration of Hindus, at 25%.

The Hindu temple at Neasden was the largest temple of Hinduism in Europe until the opening of the Shri Venkateswara (Balaji) Temple in Tividale in 2006. Other temples are in nearby Wembley, Harrow and Willesden, and Wimbledon and Newham in South and East London.

Hare Krishna are sometimes seen on the streets of London, particularly near the Radha Krishna Temple in Soho.

The largest Diwali celebration each year takes place in Trafalgar Square, and is organised by the Greater London Authority.

== Sikhism ==
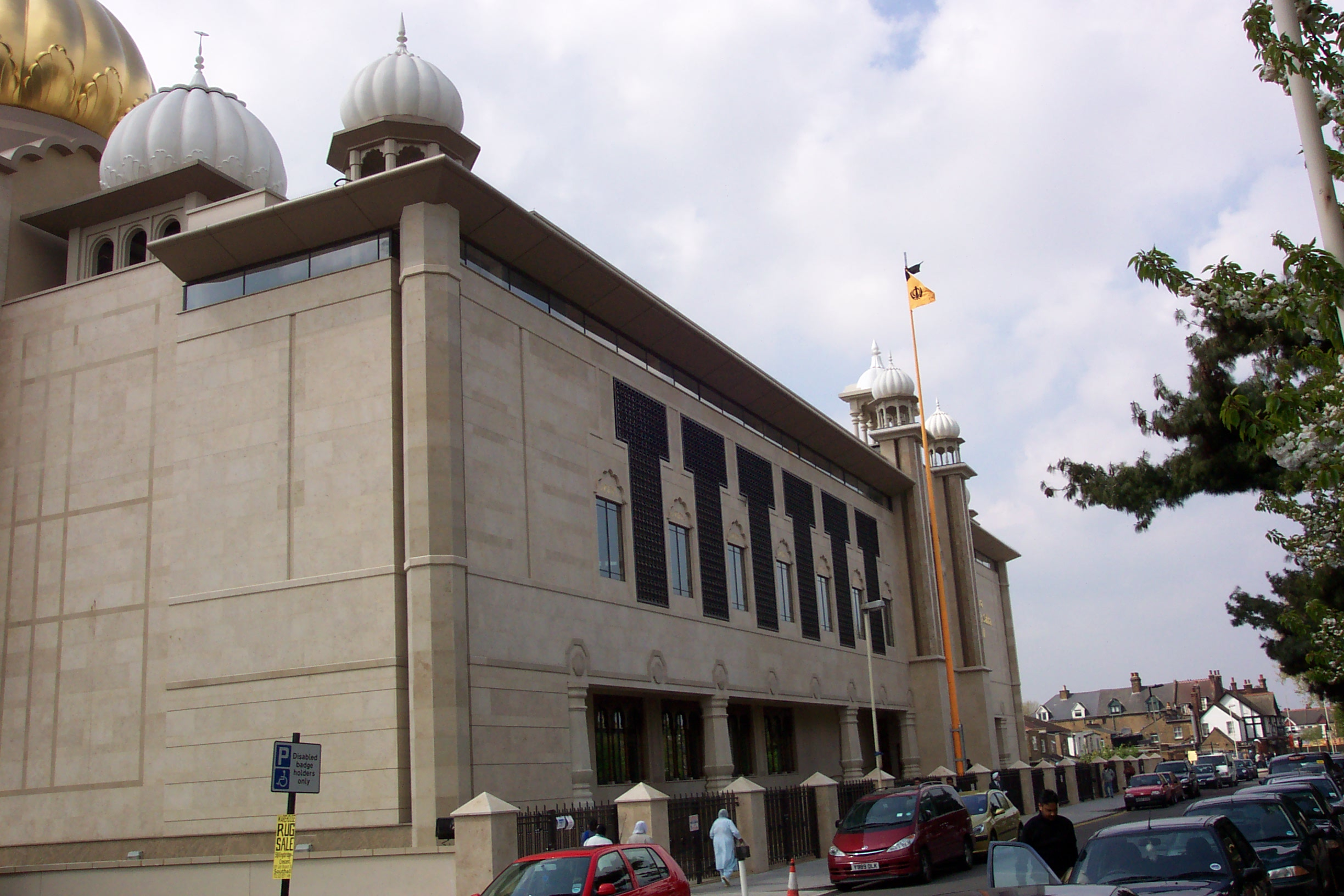
Gurdwara Sri Guru Singh Sabha in Southall.

London has a sizable Sikh population, most of whom live in London's West, in areas such as Southall, Hounslow, and Hayes. In southeast London, there are some Sikhs in Bexleyheath, Erith, Sidcup, Plumstead, and Woolwich. In northeast London, there are some in North Newham and Ilford. In northwest London, some live in northwest Brent and some parts of Harrow. The largest Sikh temple in London (and outside India) is Gurdwara Sri Guru Singh Sabha in Southall.

A large celebration of Vaisakhi takes place each year and is organised by the Greater London Authority.

== Irreligion ==
Roughly one in four Londoners has no religion, and much of London's civic life and civil society is secular in the sense that it has no religious character.

To the extent that non-religious movements have actively organised in the UK, many organise nationally from London. The non-religious humanist movement in the UK largely began in London in the 19th century with the foundation of various "ethical churches" and "ethical societies". Over time, these groups came to form the basis of non-religious charities in the UK: Conway Hall, based in the former South Place Ethical Society in Holborn, and Humanists UK, which was formed by the merger of the UK's remaining ethical societies. Of Humanists UK's London chapters, the largest is the Central London Humanist Group, which frequently meets at Conway Hall.

The 19th-century non-religious congregational model of the ethical churches still persists to some extent. The non-religious Sunday Assembly movement began in London in 2013. Unitarian groups in Islington and Hackney also now organise under the umbrella of the "New Unity" church, which describes itself as "a non-religious church".

== See also ==
- Wembley’s Conference of Living Religions 1924
- List of churches in London
- Demographics of London
- Religion in England
