= List of annual events in London =

List of major annual events in London, England, by month.

| Month | Event | Location | Year first run |
|---|---|---|---|
| January | New Year's Day Parade | Westminster | 1987 |
| February | Chinese New Year | Soho | 1985 |
| March | Head of the River Race | River Thames | 1926 |
| March | St Patrick's Day Parade | Westminster | 2002 |
| April | London Marathon | Greenwich, Southwark, Tower Hamlets, City of London, Westminster | 1981 |
| April | Ideal Home Show | Olympia London | 1908 |
| April | St George's Day | Trafalgar Square | |
| April | The Boat Race | Putney to Mortlake on the River Thames | 1829 |
| April | Vaisakhi | Trafalgar Square, Westminster | |
| April | London Book Fair | Olympia London | |
| April | The Passion of Jesus at Trafalgar Square | Trafalgar Square, Westminster | 2010 |
| May | Chelsea Flower Show | Royal Hospital Chelsea | 1862 |
| May | FA Cup Final and Women's FA Cup Final | Various | 1872 at Oval Kennington 1923 at former Wembly Stadium 1971 at Crystal Palace National Recreation Centre (Women's) 2007 at current Wembly Stadium |
| June | Trooping the Colour | Horse Guards Parade, Westminster | c.1660-1685 |
| June | West End LIVE | Westminster | 2005 |
| June | Barnes Children's Literature Festival | Barnes, London | 2015 |
| June | City of London Festival | City of London | 1962 |
| June | Carnival de Cuba | Southwark Park | 2005 |
| June | Pride in London | Westminster | 1972 |
| June | World Naked Bike Ride | Central London | 2001 |
| June | London Festival of Architecture | All of Greater London | 2004 |
| July | Hampton Court Flower Show | Hampton Court Park | 1990 |
| July | The Championships, Wimbledon | All England Lawn Tennis Club | 1877 |
| August | The BBC Proms | Royal Albert Hall | 1895 |
| August | Carnaval Del Pueblo | Burgess Park | 1999 |
| August | Notting Hill Carnival | Notting Hill | 1964 |
| August | Formula E (London ePrix) | Inaugural event was in street circuit in Battersea, later moving to ExCeL London | 2015 |
| August | The Hundred | Oval and Lord's cricket grounds | 2021 |
| September | London Open House | All of Greater London | 1992 |
| September | Black on the Square | Trafalgar Square | 2023 |
| October | London Film Festival | BFI Southbank | 1957 |
| October | Diwali | Trafalgar Square | 2012 |
| November | Lord Mayor's Show | City of London | 1215 |
| November | Remembrance Sunday | Various locations including The Cenotaph and Hyde Park Corner | 1919 |
| November | Winter Wonderland | Hyde Park | 2008 |
| December | New Year's Eve Celebrations | Along the River Thames in the boroughs of Lambeth, Westminster and The City | |
