= Caledonian Road, London =

Road in the London Borough of Islington

Coordinates: 51.5460°N 0.1180°W

A5203

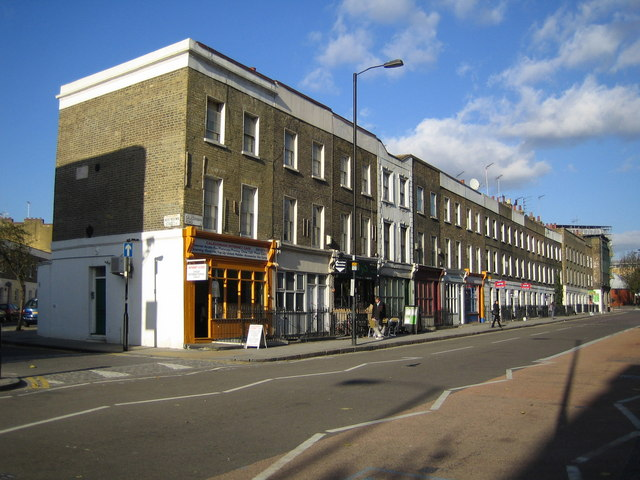
- The Caledonian Road at the junction with Northdown Road

Route information
- Length: 2.6 mi (4.2 km)

Major junctions
- South end: Kings Cross
- A5200; A501; A503
- North end: Holloway

Location
- Country: United Kingdom
- Primary destinations: King's Cross; Barnsbury; Holloway

Road network
- Roads in the United Kingdom; Motorways; A and B road zones
← A5202	→ A5204

Caledonian Road in the London Borough of Islington, England, connects North London, from Camden Road near its junction with Holloway Road, and central London's Pentonville Road in the south. A mile and a half long, it is known colloquially as the Cally and forms the entirety of the A5203.

== Character ==
The road is mostly residential from Camden Road until it reaches Caledonian Road Underground station. Residential developments have been constructed around the station including student accommodation. South of the station near the bridge carrying the North London line is Pentonville Prison. South of the prison the road is lined with shops and cafes including several Ethiopian restaurants. The area is poor compared to the north end and the shops serve the council estates bordering the road and the more affluent Barnsbury area of mostly Georgian terraces to the east. The road crosses the Regents Canal at Thornhill Bridge and to the south are trendy shops and restaurants that have opened as a result of the King's Cross Central developments. The road ends at Pentonville Road near King's Cross railway station and the border with Camden. Housmans Bookshop, specialist radical book and magazine retailers established in 1945, is at No.5, as are the offices of Peace News and London Greenpeace, the people behind the McLibel Trial.

In August 2013, the railway bridge over the road was repainted to remove the word "Ferodo" (one of many such bridges advertising the company name) and replaced it with the street's informal name, "The Cally". As of September 2016, Phil Coy's "your right to continued existence [cally colour chart]" was installed under "The Cally" bridge. The work illuminates the underside of the bridge with one colour at a time, with each colour's name simultaneously displayed on a dot matrix screen. The palette of 191 colour names was developed in consultation with local community groups with reference to the Caledonian Road's history.

The road was the subject of an hour-long episode in the 2012 BBC and Open University co-production, The Secret History of Our Streets, which chose the Caledonian Road as a typical London example. The road is mentioned in the song "Up The Bracket" by The Libertines.

== History ==
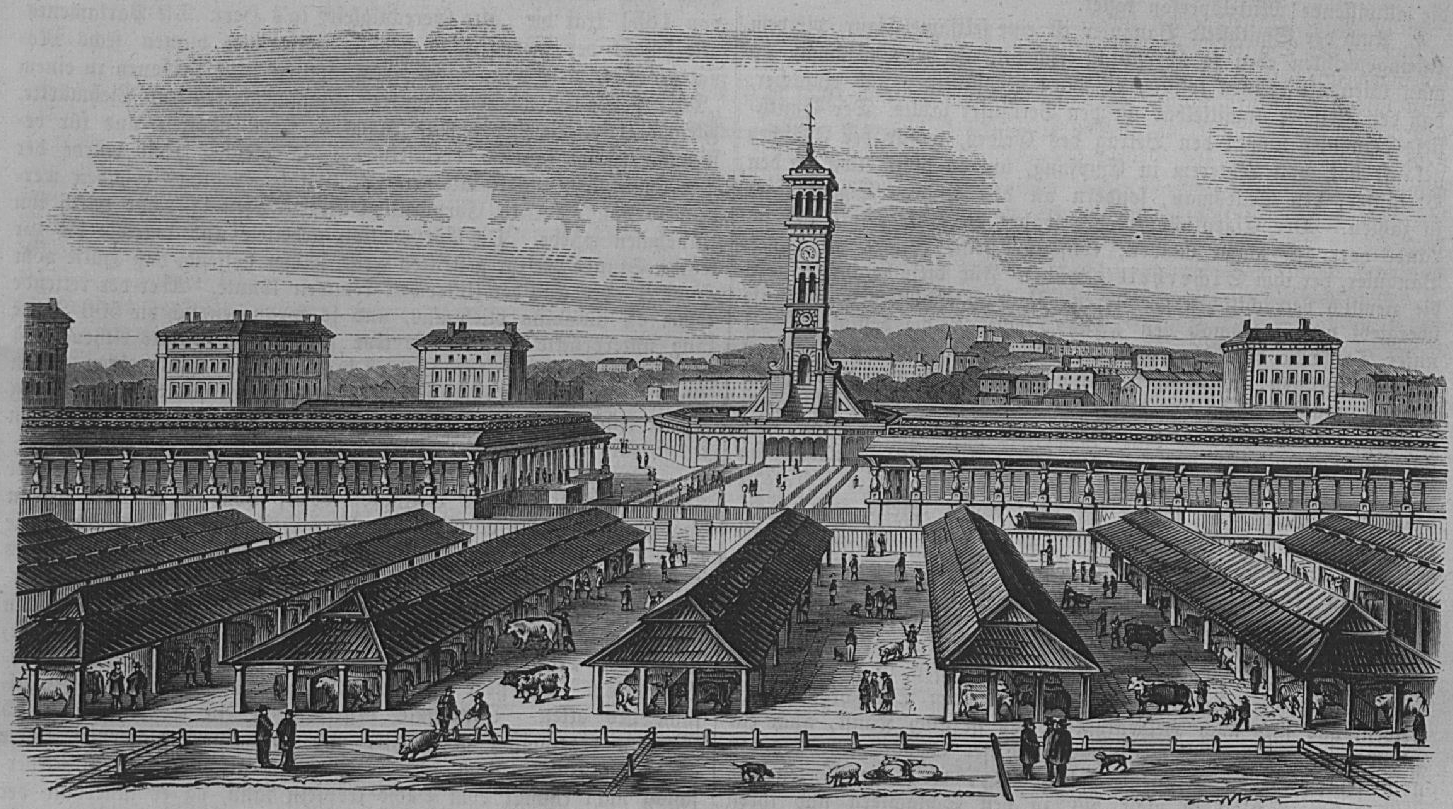
The Metropolitan Cattle Market as seen in 1855

The road was constructed in pursuance of an act of Parliament, the Battle Bridge and Holloway Road (Middlesex) Act 1825 (6 Geo. 4. c. clvi), obtained by the Battle Bridge and Holloway Road Company. The company built the Caledonian Road in 1826 as a toll road to link the New Road with Holloway Road (which is part of the Great North Road) and provide a new link to the West End from the north.

Originally known as Chalk Road, its name was changed after the Royal Caledonian Asylum for the children of poor exiled Scots, was built in the area in 1828. The building has since been demolished and its site is occupied by local authority housing, the Caledonian Estate built 1900–7.

The first residential buildings on the road were those of Thornhill Place (now numbers 106–146), first occupied in 1832; other terraces followed in the 1840s. From around 1837 to 1849, cottages in gardens were built between Brewery Road and the site of the railway which were part of the failed Experimental Gardens or French Colony founded by a philanthropist, Peter Baume. Due to poor lighting and roads, the cottages declined into slums.

Pentonville Prison was built in 1842 immediately to the south of the asylum. Cattle drovers passed along the road on their way to Smithfield until 1852 when the City of London Corporation transferred the Metropolitan Cattle Market to the Caledonian Market.

In the mid 20th century, many communities were attracted to Caledonian Road by its relatively low property prices. An Irish community grew there; and in 1955, a cache of weapons belonging to the Irish Republican Army was discovered in the cellar of No. 257 Caledonian Road.

In the 21st century much of the commercial and residential property on the road has come under the ownership of notorious rogue landlord Andrew Panayi, one of England's biggest private landlords, who owns at least 200 properties on Caledonian Road alone. Panayi, who featured on the documentary The Secret History of Our Streets in 2012, has boasted publicly of his exploitation of tenants in the area, claiming "if there's milk in the cow, milk it". Although he has been accused and convicted on a number of occasions for a litany of offences, including illegally leasing substandard properties, revenge evictions and building residential properties without council permission, as of 2021 Panayi was still operating on the Caledonian Road.

== Buildings ==
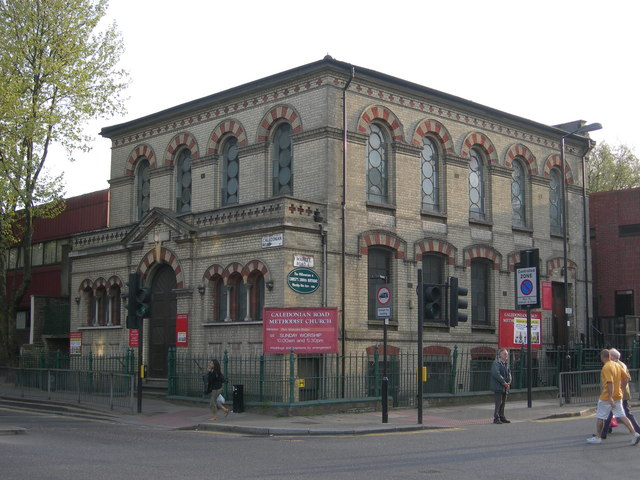
Caledonian Road Methodist Church

The road has a number of architecturally important or interesting buildings. Its listed buildings include an Italianate Methodist Chapel built in 1870; the Caledonian Estate, an early Edwardian flatted estate; Pentonville Prison; and the Flying Scotsman, a 1901 public house and offices. Caledonian Road Underground station is also Grade II listed.

University College London's controversial New Hall building attracted negative responses from some architectural critics on its completion for its purported failure to accommodate its Victorian facade with the building behind. It was awarded the 2013 Carbuncle Cup for the ugliest building in the United Kingdom.

The road passes near to Islington Council social housing estates such as Bemerton, Barnsbury and Boston Estates and Naish Court.

== Safety ==
- On 29 January 2019, a 17-year-old, named Nedim Bilgin, was stabbed to death in a street attack.
- On 4 July 2020, a 22-year-old, Imani Allaway-Muirnamed, was gunned down on Roman Way, parallel to Caledonian Road, in broad daylight, next to a children's play park and Pentonville Prison.

== Transport ==
=== Train ===
- Caledonian Road Underground station
- Caledonian Road & Barnsbury station
- The area is well-served with quick access to Kentish Town station, which is a 10-minute walk away

=== Buses ===
- 17: Archway – London Bridge
- 91: Crouch End – Trafalgar Square
- 153: Finsbury Park – Liverpool Street
- 259: Edmonton Green – King's Cross
- 274: Islington Angel – Lancaster Gate
- 390: Archway – Victoria
- 393: Clapton - Chalk Farm
- 476: King's Cross – Northumberland Park

== Sources ==
- Baggs, A P; Bolton, Diane K; Croot, Patricia E C (1985). "Islington: Growth, Holloway and Tollington". In Baker, T F T; Elrington, C R (eds.). A History of the County of Middlesex. Vol. 8, Islington and Stoke Newington Parishes. London. pp. 29–37 – via British History Online.
