= Frank Baum =

Frank Baum may refer to:

- L. Frank Baum (1856–1919), American author of children's books, notably The Wonderful Wizard of Oz
- Frank Joslyn Baum (1883–1958), American lawyer, soldier, writer, and film producer; son of the author L. Frank Baum
- Frank Baum (footballer) (born 1956), German footballer

== See also ==
- Baum
