= Beaume =

Beaume may refer to:

== Several communes in France ==
- La Beaume, arrondissement of Gap, Hautes-Alpes
- La Haute-Beaume, arrondissement of Gap, Hautes-Alpes
- Beaumes-de-Venise, a canton of the arrondissement of Carpentras, Vaucluse
  - Muscat de Beaumes-de-Venise, the sweet wine appellation, and "Beaume de Venise", the wine grape
- Beaumettes, also a canton of Carpentras.
- Beaumé, a commune in the arrondissement of Vervins, Aisne

== Other ==
- Antoine Baumé (1728–1804), French chemist
- Baume et Mercier, Swiss watchmakers
- The Beaume (river), a tributary of the Ardèche (river) in southern France

== See also ==
- Baume (disambiguation)
- Beaune
