= Boim =

Boim or Boym, or a romanization of the Yiddish noun בוים ('tree'), is a Yiddish variation of the family name Baum and may refer to:

- Michał Boym (1612–1659), Polish Jesuit
- Benedykt Boym (1629–1670), Polish Catholic priest, Jesuit, author of theological works
- Svetlana Boym, Curt Hugo Reisinger Professor of Slavic and Comparative Literatures at Harvard University.
- Yaron Boim (born 1965), Israeli educator
- Ze`ev Boim, Israeli politician

== See also ==
- Chapel of Boim family
