= Tree test =

Tree test may mean:

- Tree testing, a method of evaluating topic trees for findability
- Baum test, projective drawing technique developed by Karl Koch
