= Baume =

Baume or Baumé may refer to:

== Places in France ==
- Baume-les-Dames, a commune in the Doubs department
- Baume-les-Messieurs, formerly Baume-les-Moines, a commune in the Jura department
  - Baume Abbey, near Baume-les-Messieurs
- Saint-Maximin-la-Sainte-Baume, a commune in the Var department

== Other ==
- Baume (surname)
- Baume et Mercier, Swiss watchmaker company
- Baume (watch), Swiss watch brand, subsidiary of Baume & Mercier
- Baumé scale
- Baumé Restaurant, French restaurant in California, US
