= Annie Mac =

Irish broadcaster and DJ

- DJ'ing in Brighton
- Born: Annie Macmanus; 18 July 1978 (age 48); Dublin, Ireland
- Education: Queen's University Belfast
- Occupations: DJ; broadcaster; writer
- Spouse: Toddla T (m. 2018)
- Children: 2

Annie Macmanus (born 18 July 1978), known professionally as Annie Mac, is an Irish DJ, broadcaster and writer. She hosted a variety of shows on BBC Radio 1, including BBC Switch and Future Sounds. She also DJed in various locations, including hosting her AMP (Annie Mac Presents) Lost and Found venues in places like Ibiza.

== Personal life ==
Mac was born in Dublin, Ireland, on 18 July 1978, and has three siblings. Her brother, Davey Macmanus, was the lead singer and guitarist in bands the Crocketts and the Crimea. After attending Wesley College in Dublin, Mac studied English literature at The Queen's University of Belfast. She lives in Queen's Park, London. She has a son (born May 2013) with her husband, DJ Toddla T. She gave birth to their second child on 6 January 2017. While she was on maternity leave, her radio show was presented by MistaJam; Mac returned to the station on 12 June 2017. Mac left Radio 1 in July 2021 to spend more time with her family.

== Career ==
Mac played gigs in Ireland at the start of her career. Her first BBC Radio 1 programme was broadcast on 29 July 2004. She had been a producer at BBC Radio 1 before this and was heard as a voice for jingles on the station at least as far back as February 2004.

Mac's first live set with the station was at BBC Radio 1's Big Weekend in Dundee in May 2006 as part of the Essential Mix live broadcast. She remarked on air at the time how it was the first time they had trusted her to do a live mix.

Annie hosted programmes on BBC Radio 1. Her main programme, called Radio 1's Future Sounds, aired from 18:00 to 20:00 on Mondays to Thursdays, playing mainly newly released dance-pop, hip-hop, rock and indie. Additionally, her Friday night dance-based show (Radio 1's Dance Party) is broadcast between 18:00 and 20:00. She previously hosted BBC Switch with close friend and fellow DJ Nick Grimshaw on Sunday evenings from 19:00 to 21:00 until 21 March 2010. After this date, they moved to 22:00 – midnight with a new show simply called Nick Grimshaw and Annie Mac.

A popular feature is the Annie Mac Mini Mix, an opportunity to showcase various DJs' ability to produce a five-minute mix with other DJs. The Mini mix was also a feature of her previous show on a Thursday night. She was a regular stand-in for Zane Lowe's show before he left the station. In 2009, Mac won the Best Female award at the drum and bass awards for her contribution to the promotion of this genre of music.

Mac made regular appearances as a feature presenter on BBC Two's The Culture Show, giving her opinions on the latest music offerings. She appeared on Never Mind the Buzzcocks in January 2006 and she co-presented Top of the Pops on 18 June 2006 with Reggie Yates, and on 11 July 2006 with Rufus Hound in a T in the Park special. Mac has also filled in for Zane Lowe on his Gonzo show on MTV2. She regularly DJs b2b with Jonny Birchall and Will Phillips at clubs including Moles, Ponana, Zero Zero, The Nest, Second Bridge Nightclub and Club XL all in Bath, Night Digital in Brighton and university venues such as Fitzwilliam College, Cambridge, and Aston University. She has also appeared on ITV comedy FM, as herself.

On 18 February 2007, BBC Radio 1 launched their first video podcast or vodcast. It featured Mac on a backstage tour around the Radio 1 buildings. This has since been stopped; however, there is now a podcast of the Mini Mix.

Mac has also presented Other Voices for RTÉ Two.

In September 2009, Mac released her first compilation album, Annie Mac Presents, followed in the subsequent two years by Annie Mac Presents 2010 and Annie Mac Presents 2011.

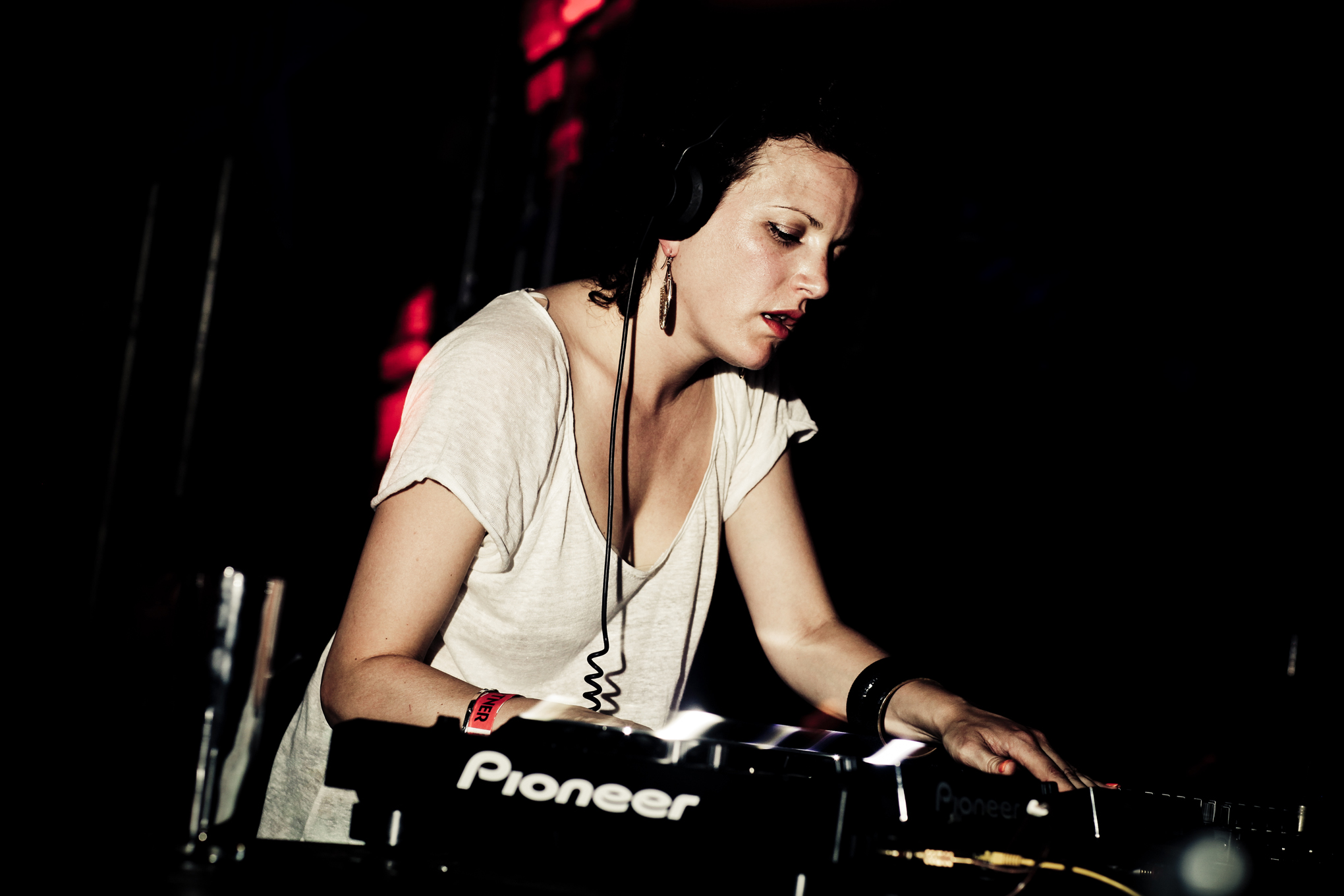
Annie Mac performing at Amnesia, 2012

In August 2012, Mac was one of the DJs selected by Channel 4 to hold a live six-hour, televised House Party on Bank Holiday Friday.

Mac released Annie Mac Presents 2012 in October 2012; the tracklisting contained some of the songs Mac played on the Channel 4 House Party. Tracks by Knife Party and Steve Aoki headlined the tracklisting.

On 31 December 2012, Mac was one of the DJs selected by Channel 4 to hold a live six-hour, televised New Year's House Party. Mac dj'd. In November 2014, she began hosting Annie Mac Presents on SiriusXM's BPM in the United States, starting at 21:00. ET. into the New Year on this televised event.

On 15 February 2015, it was announced Mac had taken over Zane Lowe's Radio 1 evening show airing Monday–Thursdays 19:00 to 21:00.

In January 2017, Mac presented a BBC Three programme called Who Killed the Night, investigating the status of British nightclubs following many closures, notably the Fabric closure and reopening and property developments on sites of former clubs, visiting the site of former Kings Cross club Bagley's/Canvas. The programme featured interviews with the newly appointed night czar Amy Lamé.

In March 2021, Mac announced her first book, Mother Mother, with her birth name in the author's title of the book. It was released on 27 May of that year and became a Sunday Times bestseller. The book centres on Mary and her son TJ in Belfast, and various challenges including motherhood and grief.

On 20 April 2021, Mac announced her departure from Radio 1 after 17 years, citing the need to spend more time with her husband Toddla T and their children. She made the emotional announcement live on air during Greg James' Radio 1 Breakfast Show. It was also announced that fellow Radio 1 DJ, Clara Amfo, would take over Annie's Future Sounds show from July, while Danny Howard would take over the Radio 1's Dance Party show. Annie Mac's final Radio 1 show was broadcast on 30 July 2021.

In May 2023, Mac released her second novel, The Mess We're In, a coming-of-age story about Dubliner Orla who moves in with her friend's band in London and tries to juggle pursuing music, partying and her job at an Irish pub.

On 10 June 2023, Mac supported Harry Styles at Slane Castle, performing to a crowd of more than 80,000 people. Annie was the second support act to play on the day, taking to the stage at around 3:30pm, preceded by Mitch Rowland, and followed by Inhaler (band) and Wet Leg.

In September 2023, Mac reunited with Nick Grimshaw to launch the brand-new BBC Sounds podcast Sidetracked with Annie and Nick, which sees the pair chat about the week in their lives and popular culture. Weekly episodes of the podcast drop on Thursdays.

On 13 November 2023, Mac was guest on BBC2 Between the Covers, with Adrian Edmondson, Chris McCausland and Angela Barnes.

== Annie Mac Presents: Lost & Found Festival ==
Annie Mac Presents: Lost & Found Festival, is an annual music festival that takes place in St. Paul's Bay, Malta, during May. The festival was started in 2015 and is curated by Mac, who was named as the Festival Ambassador of Malta in 2018, and was presented with the award by Malta's Minister for Tourism. The four-day event is split between a number of day and night parties at a variety of venues across the island, including Café Del Mar, which hosts the daytime pool parties.
