= Bagley's =

Nightclub in London

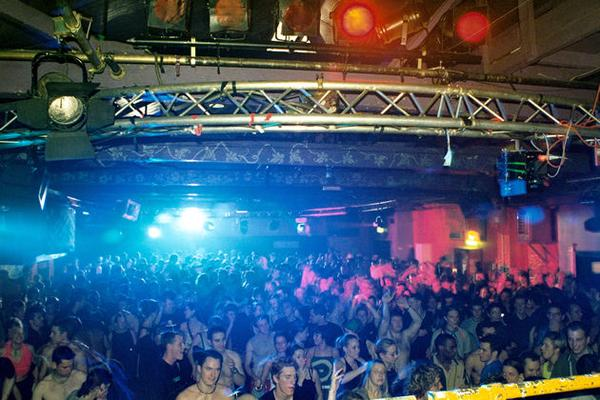
- Rave hosted at Bagley's in 2007
- Interactive map of Bagley's
- Address: Kings Cross Freight Depot, York Way; London; England
- Location: King's Cross
- Coordinates: 51.5360°N 0.1270°W
- Operator: Tony Askew (1991–2003); Billy Reilly (2003–2008)
- Capacity: 2,500
- Type: Warehouse music venue/Nightclub
- Events: Electronic, Dance, Rave, Hardcore, Drum & Bass, Jungle, Garage

Construction
- Built: 1851
- Opened: 1991
- Closed: January 2008

Bagley's was a large warehouse music venue, that was located in Kings Cross, London, that was officially opened in 1991. In 2003, it was renamed Canvas. Club nights hosted at the venue included Freedom, Philip Sallon’s Mud Club and the Pussy Posse Party.

Bagley's was named after a Yorkshire based company, who once made glass bottles in the warehouse. The club started during the era when the UK government began to crack-down on outdoor illegal raves, that culminated in the introduction of the Criminal Justice and Public Order Act 1994, which shut down these illegal raves.

The venue included multiple rooms and had an outdoor terrace area. Bagley's also hosted a number of secret shows for musicians such as Prince, Massive Attack, Depeche Mode and the Rolling Stones. The venue closed at the beginning of 2008, after hosting a final New Years Eve rave. Bagley's was London's largest club.

The clubs address was Kings Cross Freight Depot, York Way, London N1, in an area that now forms part of Kings Cross Central. The location is known as Coal Drops Yard. The site was subject to re-development as part of a large regeneration project.

== History ==
The warehouse the club was based in was originally built in 1851 and was used to store London's coal supplies. Later, Bagley, Wild and Company, who were glass manufacturers, took over the building that became Bagley's. After the industrial era, it became derelict and the area was largely wastelands.

The club was established by Tony Askew. The original lease cost of the warehouse was £3 per week and the venue was used for music video shoots, such as Tina Turner's Private Dancer LP. The venue was known as Bagleys Film Studios. In the late 1980s Tony Askew's son asked if he could put on a club night and the success of this led to the studios becoming a club. Tony Askew also hosted roller discos at Bagley's, before opening Roller Nation at a different London venue. The venue continued to be used for other purposes, such as Alexander McQueen showcasing his 1995 Spring/Summer collection, "The Birds".

Bagley's had a capacity of 2,500. The London Museum has a flyer promoting The Film Studio party, which was hosted at Bagley's on Christmas Day in 1994. The summer of 1995 saw Raindance hold an event at the venue, titled "Spirit of Raindance". In 1996 and 1997, DJ Ariel used to play 10 hour sets at Freedom. Double Dipped hosted parties at the venue. Many people who visited Bagley's described it as being the club that was most like an illegal rave. World Dance hosted legendary nights at the club. Slammin' Vinyl promoted many nights at Bagley's with rooms focused on music genres such as garage and hardcore. Mixmag described the venue as having "gone down in UK dance music history". Towards the end of the 1990s Ryan Perry used to host drum and bass nights at the club. Because the club had multiple rooms, with different types of music in each, it exposed clubbers to new genres of music. The Panjabi Hit Squad remembers Bagley's for hosting Hoo-Haa, the Asian music night, in the 90s to early 00s, with bands such as Apna Sangeet, Asian DJs and mainstream DJs like EZ and Grooverider.

Billy Reilly, who ran The Cross, took over running the club in 2003 and it was renamed Canvas. Bagley's was located next to The Cross, another electronic music venue, based in disused railway arches in Goods Yard, that opened two years after Bagley's. Prior to this, Reilly ran his family's car repair and haulage company, in nearby arches, from the 1980s. Network Rail, who owned the warehouse, were responsible for leasing the venue.

After a final rave at the end of 2007, Bagley's closed in January 2008.

=== Bagley's legacy ===
In 2016, Junglist Network rated Bagley's as one of the best venues of the 1990s, remembering it for events such as Best of British, Desire and Labyrinth and noting its massive main room and maze of smaller rooms. DJ Annie Mac visited the site and discussed Bagley's in her 2017 BBC Three documentary, "Who Killed the Night", which explored the closure of many UK nightclubs. Many remember the area as being "the beating heart of London's ecstasy-fuelled nightclub scene". In a visit to the area in 2020, reminders of the areas history and clubbing scene included a walkway on the old railway viaduct that is named 'Bagley Walk' and in Coal Drops Yard there are photos showing the clubbing culture that used to be in the area, prior to re-development. In 2022, photographs of clubbers at Bagley's, taken by Tristan O'Neill in 1996, at a jungle event hosted at the venue, were included in an exhibition that was titled "Grown Up in Britain: 100 Years of Teenage Kicks".

== See also ==
- List of electronic dance music venues
- Superclub
