= Pierre Baume =

Pierre Baume may refer to:

- Pierre Henri Joseph Baume (1797–1875), French socialist, active in England
- Pierre de la Baume (1477–1544), French courtier and cardinal
