= Caledonian Estate =

Housing estate in Islington, London

Coordinates: 51°32′45.5″N 0°07′03.6″W

The Caledonian Estate
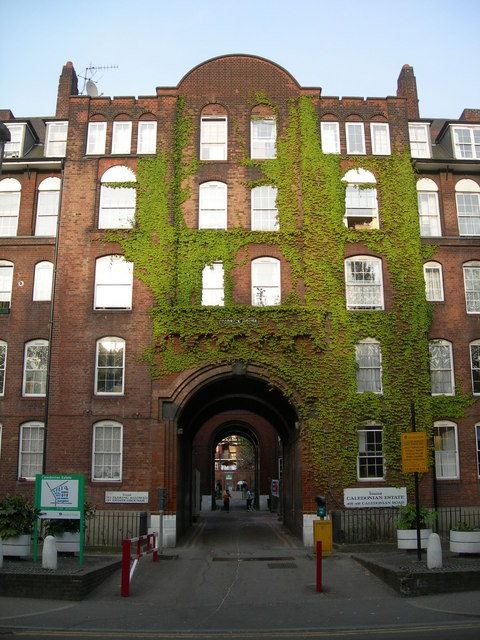
- Entrance to Carrick House, Caledonian Road
- Interactive map of the The Caledonian Estate area

General information
- Type: Flatted Estate
- Architectural style: Victorian Gothic, Arts and Crafts
- Location: 408–416 (inclusive) Caledonian Road, Islington, United Kingdom
- Construction started: 1900
- Completed: 1907

Design and construction
- Architect: JG Stephenson
- Architecture firm: Architecture Department, London County Council
- Designations: Grade II listed

The Caledonian Estate is a Grade II listed, early Edwardian estate towards the northern end of the Caledonian Road in Islington, London. It is situated next to Pentonville Prison. The Estate was built on the site of the classical Caledonian Asylum from which the Road took its name.

Pevsner describes the building as having been constructed between 1900 and 1907, though English Heritage describes it as having been built between 1904 and 1906. A pamphlet produced by the London County Council notes that, though the Council had accepted an offer from the Asylum for the land by January 1901, construction could not begin until December 1904 as the trustees of the school needed time to erect new buildings elsewhere. The architect was James Greenwood Stephenson (1872–1950); and was designed during his time in the Housing of the Working Classes Branch of the London County Council Architect's Department.

Susan Beattie states that it is one of the two "most successful" flatted estates in the first decade of the twentieth century (along with Stephenson's Chadworth Buildings in Lever Street).

== Architect ==
Stephenson had been a student at the South Kensington Schools, before working as an improver and then a draughtsman under Sir Arthur Blomfield from 1892 to 1893. He joined the LCC the following year. Stephenson became an associate of the RIBA in 1896, sponsored by Blomfield (as well as the Scottish architect, John Slater). At this time (that is, between its formation in 1893 and the First World War), the work of the 'Housing of the Working Classes' branch of the LCC's Architecture Department has been said to have "the right to be counted among the highest achievements of the Arts and Crafts movement in English Architecture".

Some propose William Riley, the chief architect of the LCC, as the original architect of the Estate, and 'Rob' Robertson (1866–1939) declared on his application to the RIBA that he had "taken a leading part in designing all the large housing schemes for the LCC – for example […] Caledonian Estate".

== Style ==
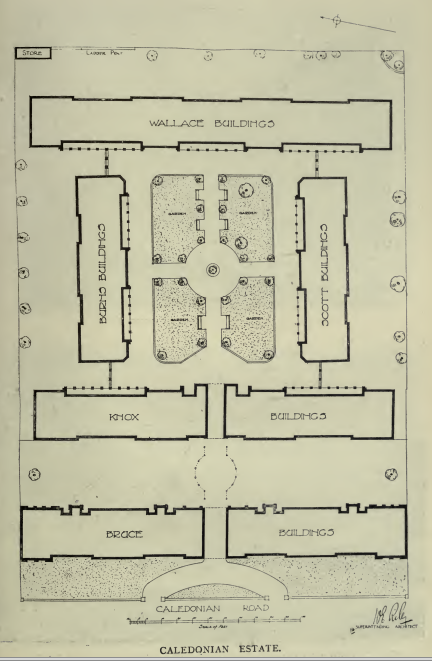
Housing for the Working Classes-107

The Estate consists of five blocks built in a mixture of Victorian Gothic and Arts and Crafts styles. The five blocks, Carrick House, Irvine House, Burns House, Scott House and Wallace House, are named for Scottish locations and writers (including Robert Burns, Sir William Wallace and Sir Walter Scott). Two blocks, Carrick and Irvine, are parallel to the road (these blocks were originally called Bruce and Knox) and the remaining three, Scott, Burns and Wallace, are organised around a large courtyard.

The entrance arch is described in Pevsner as "bold". Pevsner further describes the estate thus:

"The access to the flats from iron balconies is typical of this phase. Serious five-story blocks in red brick and glazed terracotta, enlivened with Arts and Crafts details, e.g. the parapet curving up over the octagonal end bays and the pointed relieving arches over the windows filled with herringbone brick, as favoured at the same time by Holden at the Belgrave Hospital. Playful but vandal-proof steel gates throughout by Hutchinson and Partners."

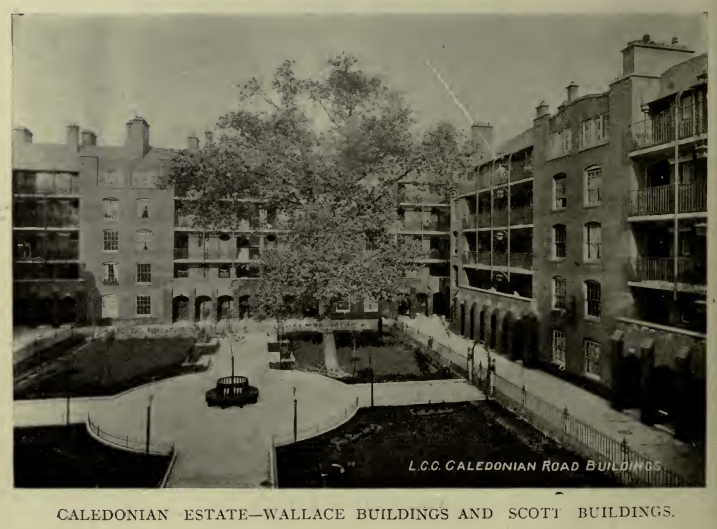
An image of the central courtyard in 1913

The block forming the quadrangle is built on the open access balcony plan (somewhat unpopular at the time). The buildings themselves are, as Susan Beattie states, "the basis for a masterly exercise in Arts and Crafts design". She states:

"the grid of horizontal and verticals established in the balconies and living-room bays is reinforced in the ground floor arcades and massive buttressed entrance blocks. Its severe geometry serves to heighten each contrast of solid with void and light with shade and to sharpen the effect of each modest flourish of decoration in the iron and brickwork"

She goes on to note that the specially designed garden gates and balcony railings "play an important part in creating a sense of place" and are "among the finest examples of architectural ironwork to have been produced in London at this period".

The buildings were granted Grade II Listed status on 30 September 1994.

== Filming location ==
The estate was used as a location in the Apple TV series Slow Horses.
