= Baum =

Baum is a German surname meaning "tree" (not to be confused with the French surname Baume). Notable people with this surname include:

- Andreas Baum (born 1978), German politician
- Bernie Baum (1929–1993), American songwriter
- Bruce Baum (born 1952), American comedian
- Carl Edward Baum (1940–2010), American electrical engineer
- Carol Baum, American film producer
- Christina Baum (born 1956), German politician
- Dale Baum, (born 1943), American historian and professor
- Dan Baum (1956–2020), American journalist and writer
- Edgar Schofield Baum (1916–2006), American artist, physician, and WW2 combat medical officer
- Fran Baum, Australian social scientist
- Frank Baum (footballer) (born 1956), German footballer
- Frank Joslyn Baum (1883–1958), American lawyer, soldier, writer and film producer
- Friedrich Baum (1727–1777), colonel in British service during the American revolutionary war
- Gerhart Baum (1932–2025), German lawyer and politician, minister of the interior
- Gregory Baum (1923 – 2017), former Catholic priest, LGBT advocate, Vatican II theologian
- Henning Baum (born 1972), German actor
- Henry Baum (born 1972), American writer
- James Edwin Baum (1887–1955), American journalist and big game hunter
- Jiří Baum (1900–1944), Czech zoologist
- L. Frank Baum (1856–1919), American author (The Wonderful Wizard of Oz), actor, and independent filmmaker
- Michael Baum (surgeon) (born 1937), British surgical oncologist who specialises in breast cancer treatment
- Oskar Baum (1883–1941), Czech music educator and writer
- Otto Baum (1911–1998), German high-ranking commander (Oberführer) of the Waffen-SS
- Paul Baum (artist) (1859–1932), German landscape painter
- Paul Baum (mathematician) (born 1936), American mathematician
- Peter Baum (born 1990), American lacrosse player
- Ray Baum (1955–2018), American lawyer and politician
- Roger S. Baum (born 1938), American banker, now children's author
- Tom Baum (born 1940), American screenwriter and playwright
- Vicki Baum (1888–1960), Austrian writer
- Walter Baum (1921–2007), German type designer
- Walter Emerson Baum (1884–1956), Pennsylvania impressionist painter
- Wilhelm Baum (historian), (born 1948), Austrian historian, publisher
- Wilhelm Baum (surgeon) (1799–1883), German surgeon
- William Wakefield Baum (1926–2015), American Roman Catholic cardinal

== See also ==
- eBaum's World
- Baum–Welch algorithm
- Baum School of Art
- Baum test (Tree Test)
- Task Force Baum
- Baume (surname)
- Bohm (disambiguation)
- Baum Baum
