= Royal Caledonian School =

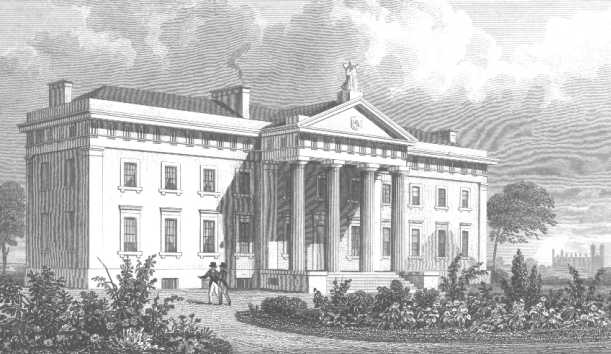
New Caledonian Asylum, 1828.

The Royal Caledonian School was a residential home and school for Scottish orphans, initially in London and subsequently in Bushey, Hertfordshire.

== History ==
The Caledonian Asylum was launched by members of the Highland Society of London in 1815 to provide a home and education for Scottish children in London who had been orphaned in the Napoleonic Wars. John Galt, the novelist, became secretary to the Asylum in 1815. The first Asylum was at 16 Cross Street, Hatton Garden, London from December 1819 until 1828 when it relocated to Copenhagen Fields, Islington. Its long residence in Islington resulted in the naming of Caledonian Market and the Caledonian Road. In 1852 Queen Victoria became Patron and the Asylum was renamed the Royal Caledonian Schools, although legally it was and still is the "Caledonian Asylum". At that time it catered for about 70 boys and 50 girls. The Asylum's band occasionally played at charitable and other events.

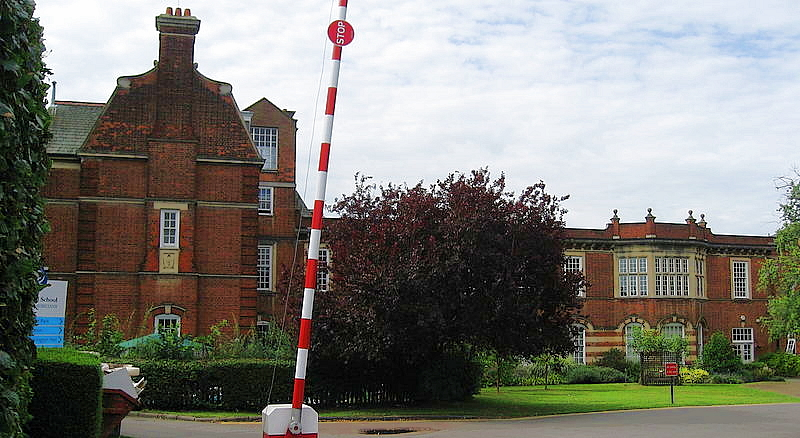
Buildings of the former Royal Caledonian School in Bushey, now housing the Purcell School.

By the late 19th century the Islington site, near to Pentonville Prison, was recognised as unsuitable, and a new boarding school was built in Bushey, Hertfordshire, from 1902. The Caledonian Estate was built on the school's site in Caledonian Road. Bricks from the old Caledonian Asylum were used to build two blocks of flats in Widdenham Road, London N7, known collectively as Loraine Mansions. The Royal Caledonian offered education until 1948, after which resident children received their education at local schools, in later years Queens' School which lies adjacent on Aldenham Road.

In 1996 the premises were sold to the Purcell School. The proceeds of the sale were used for the charity to operate as the Royal Caledonian Education Trust, which continues to provide support to "children (no age limit) of Scots who have served in the Armed Forces, or the children of poor Scots living in the London area". Another objective is to allow the children of Scots serving in the armed forces a level of continuity in their education despite the frequent re-posting of their parents.

== Notable alumni (Old Caleys) ==
- Charles Mackay, author
- Malcolm McEacharn, Australian shipping magnate, mayor of Melbourne and politician.
- James Thomson (B.V.), poet
