= Coal Drops Yard =

Shopping complex in London, England

Coordinates: 51.536336°N 0.126444°W

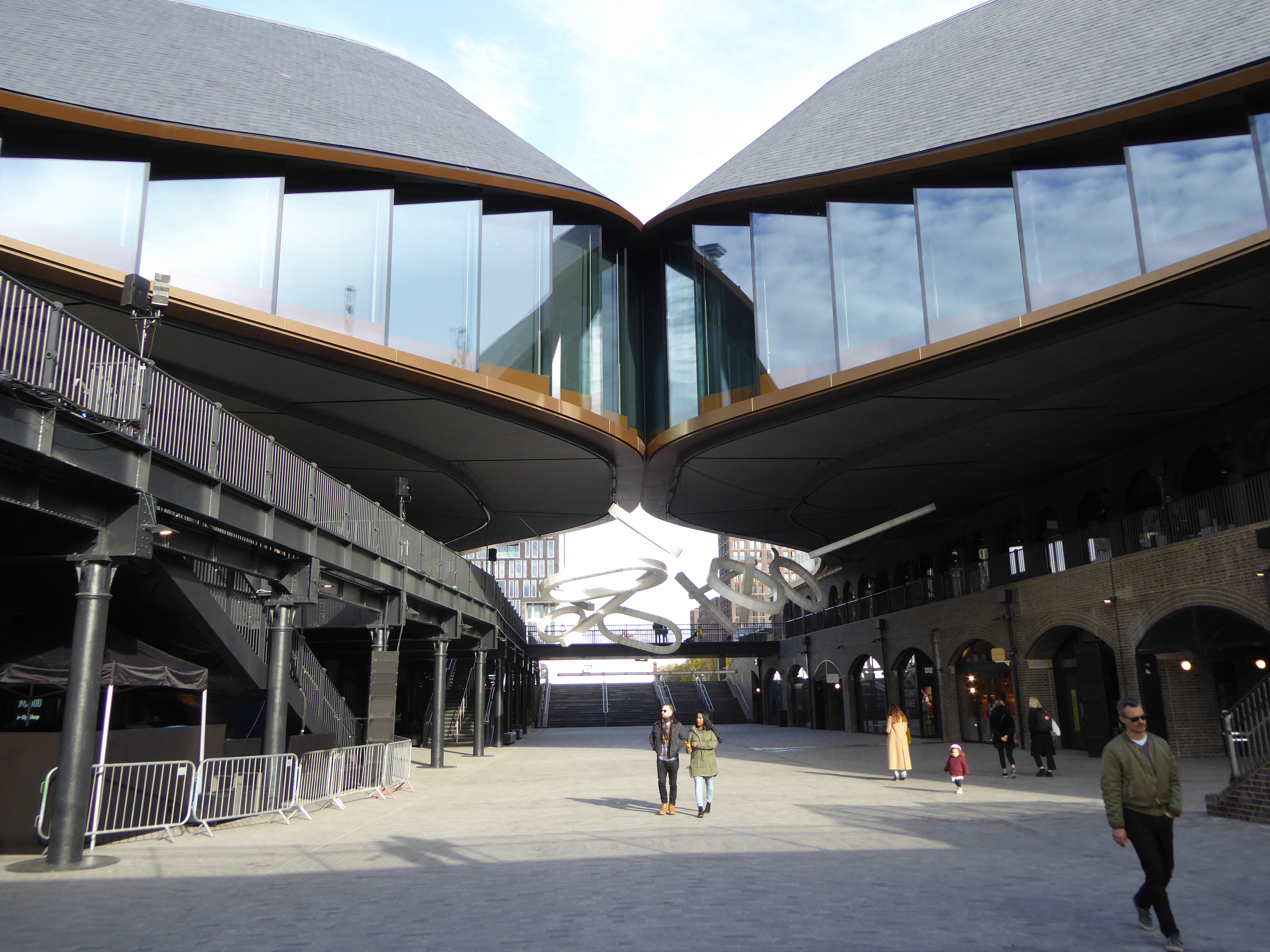
Thomas Heatherwick's Coal Drops Yard, looking north

Coal Drops Yard is a shopping complex and privately owned public space that forms part of the King's Cross Central development scheme in London, England. The development was designed by Thomas Heatherwick and opened in October 2018.

== History ==
The two Victorian coal drops sheds were used to receive coal from South Yorkshire and trans-ship it to narrowboats on the Regents Canal and to horse-drawn carts; they processed 8m tonnes a year. Coal was the only form of energy available to heat and light the buildings of London, either directly or after having been converted to coal gas in the adjacent gas works. Coal use was challenged by electricity, and electricity prevailed – the coal drops were redundant and fell into decay. They were used as warehouse units; one was gutted by fire in 1985 and another used by Bagley's nightclub, which closed in January 2008. The night clubs complemented a vibrant night life of easy drug access, raves and prostitution.

=== The coal drops ===
The Regent's Canal was named in 1820 after the Prince Regent, who became George IV the same year. After his demise, the Kings Cross monument was raised at the junction of New Road and Battlebridge Road (Euston Road and York Way); this gave the name to the area, but it was removed in 1845. This was former common land, and open to development. The Royal Commission on Metropolitan Railway Termini prohibited the railway companies from building south of Euston Road. The London and Birmingham Railway (London and North Western Railway), with George Stephenson connections had built their terminus at Euston Square in 1833–1837. The Great Northern Railway's London & York Bill received royal assent in 1846 as the Great Northern Railway Act 1846 (9 & 10 Vict. c. lxxi) and they built at King's Cross; the Midland Railway built at St Pancras in 1863–8.

Their goods yards were north of the canal with lines opening onto wharfs and basins. The topology changed with the rapidly developing economy and technology. The coal drops were in the Great Northern's western goods yard.

The eastern coal drops were built in 1851. They were essentially a long three-storey, 48-bay (cell) shed reached from the north by a viaduct. The trains came in on four tracks on the third storey; the wagon's bottom was opened, and the goods fell down chutes to the hopper floor below where they were sorted, before being lowered to the road vehicles waiting on the ground floor. The goods were often coal that needed to be graded, but could be potatoes or any heavy loose load. The hopper floor was supported on cast-iron columns and beams.

The western coal drops were built in 1860; they presented a simplified and more advanced design. The roof span was 48 feet (15 m). The rails came in on an open cast-iron viaduct that terminated under the roof. Beneath was the Coal and Stone Basin, allowing direct transhipment to canal boats. This was filled in when the adjacent Western Goods Shed was built in 1897–99. The Western coal drops became a general-purpose warehouse.

The coal offices and the Wharf Road Viaduct and Wharf Road Arches close the site to the south, where they follow the arc of the Regent's Canal. The arches were used as stabling for some of the Great Northern's large stock of horses. There were 200 horses in 1850, and 867 in 1867, eventually rising to 1500. Great Northern had a fleet of 2-tonne and 4-tonne road vehicles, as they also delivered coal directly to the customers. The horses were well stabled, and the company had its own farriers and a horse infirmary.

=== Change of use ===
In 1866, Samuel Plimsoll opened his own coal drops, south of the canal in Cambridge Street; to reach it John Jay built an independent viaduct between the buildings and over the canal. Plimsoll had invented an advanced mechanism that reduced the damage to the coal as it was 'dropped'. This reduced wastage and thus increased profit. From 1870, business moved away from both the Eastern and Western coal drops. By 1879 both of them had ceased to function as staithes, and were used for warehousing.

The Eastern Coal Drops was sold in 1876 to the glass bottle manufacturer, Bagley, Wild and Company. They were founded in 1871 in Knottingley, Yorkshire, specifically as it was close to the railway, so they could easily move their goods to London. In the 1930s, Joseph Bagley & Co Ltd were transporting thirty wagons of bottles a day to the yard.

=== The nightclubs ===
In 1986, the rave scene started in the UK. Disused warehouses were used to stage illegal raves, a form of partying fuelled by high repetitive beat House Music and the illicit drug ecstasy. The scene developed and spawned several legal clubs such as The Fridge, The Clink, Shoom and Heaven and by the early-to-mid 1990s incorporated three iconic venues in King's Cross. Initially there was Billy Reilly's original bar, "Fabric" under the arches of the Coal Offices (which inspired the name for a successor club opened by Billy's brother Keith in Farringdon, also called Fabric).

Following the granting of a full music licence, the venue in the arches reopened as the iconic "The Cross". A smaller club after-party venue opened called "The Key". At the southern end of the Eastern Coal Drops building, "Bagley's" opened, which took over three floors, and was later renamed as "Canvas", and survived on and off till 2008. It could accommodate 2500 clubbers on a Saturday night. It was reputed to have had some of London's best DJs. However, by 2008 the building had become largely derelict again and finally closed. Both the 2008 financial crisis (which caused a recession) and the ban on smoking indoors were blamed, as well as the general redevelopment plans for the entire site.

=== Redevelopment ===
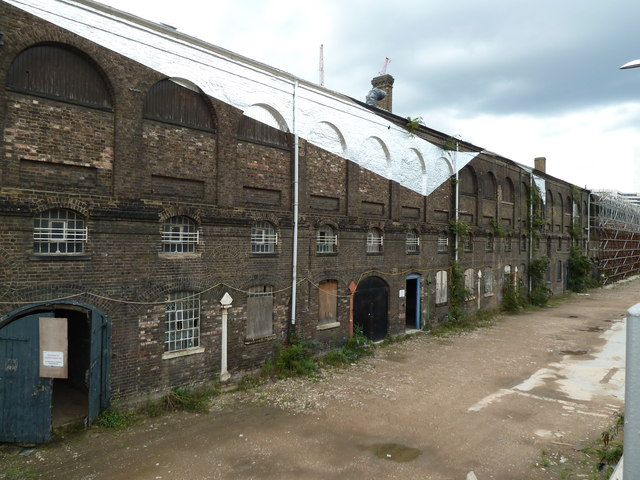
The site in 2013

Argent Group, the overall developer for the King's Cross Central site, appointed Thomas Heatherwick as architect for the redevelopment of the Coal Drop Yards as a retail park in 2014. Heatherwick worked in conjunction with engineers Arup, and the plans were approved in December 2015. BAM Nuttall undertook the construction work, which started in February 2016, following a two-year pre-construction phase to survey the condition of the Victorian era buildings and carry out demolition work as necessary. Work was completed and the development opened on 26 October 2018.

== Design ==
The £100m project called for the listed Victorian sheds to be converted into a new high-end, 9,290 square-metre, shopping complex and privately owned public space. Thomas Heatherwick took the two converging arcaded sheds and connected them with the "kissing roof". The two brick and wrought-iron coal drops were designed at different times so were structurally different, but shared a common roof line. Heatherwick's scheme takes the analogy of how a strip of paper can be twisted, and does the same to the slate roof finish. He uses the brick sheds as a base, and constructs the plastic form of the roof from steel tubing. The result is an additional glazed space, in the roof, two storeys high that adds 20,000 square feet (1,900 m^{2}) of space. The 35m-wide roof adds no extra weight to the wall structures; it is supported on a 54 steel columns that are embedded within the building. The slate used in the roof comes from the same seam in the same Welsh slate quarry as was used in the original roof.

There are 9290 square metres of shopping space, in units ranging from 15 to 1,800 square metres.

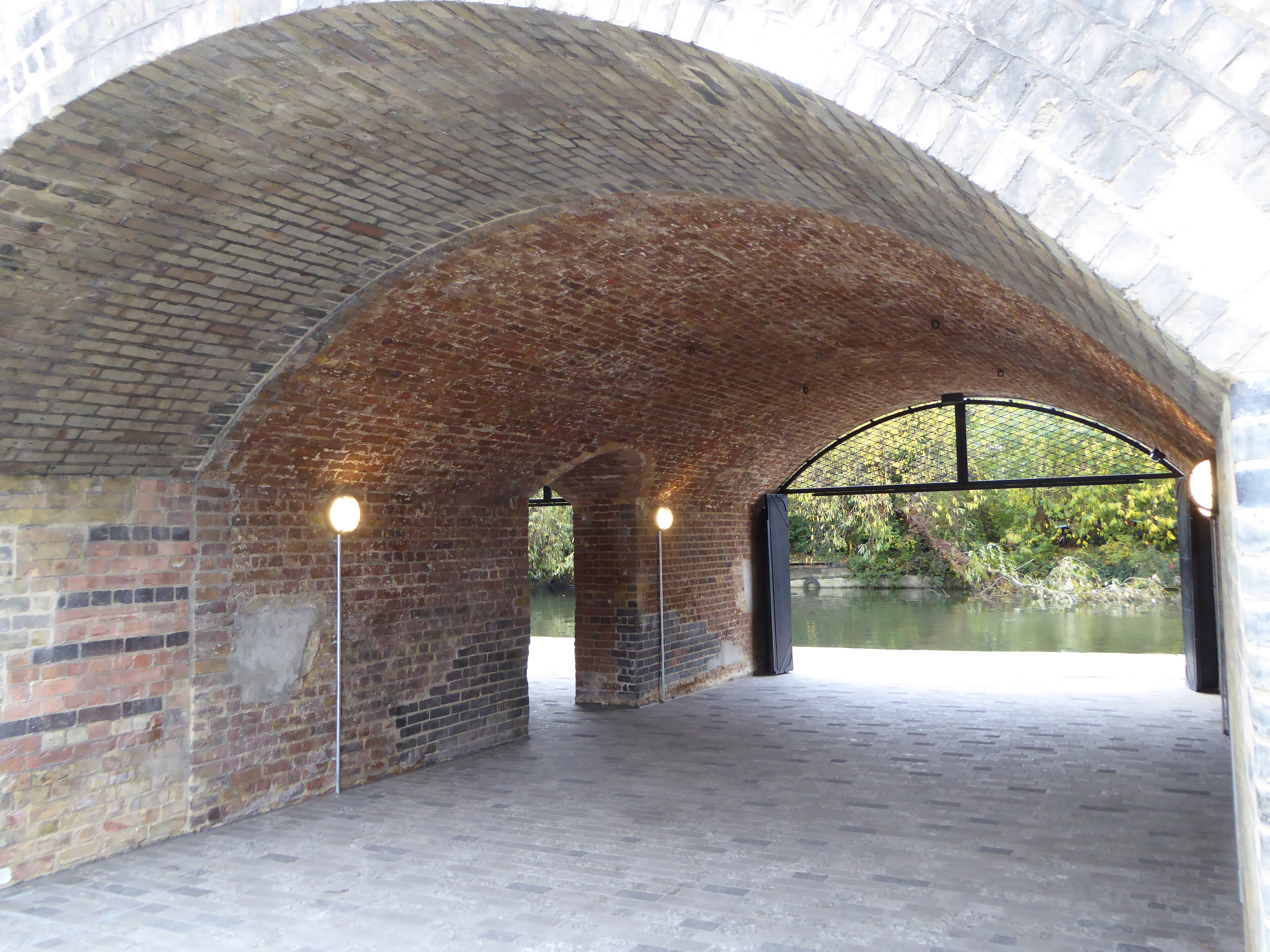
Wharf Road arches

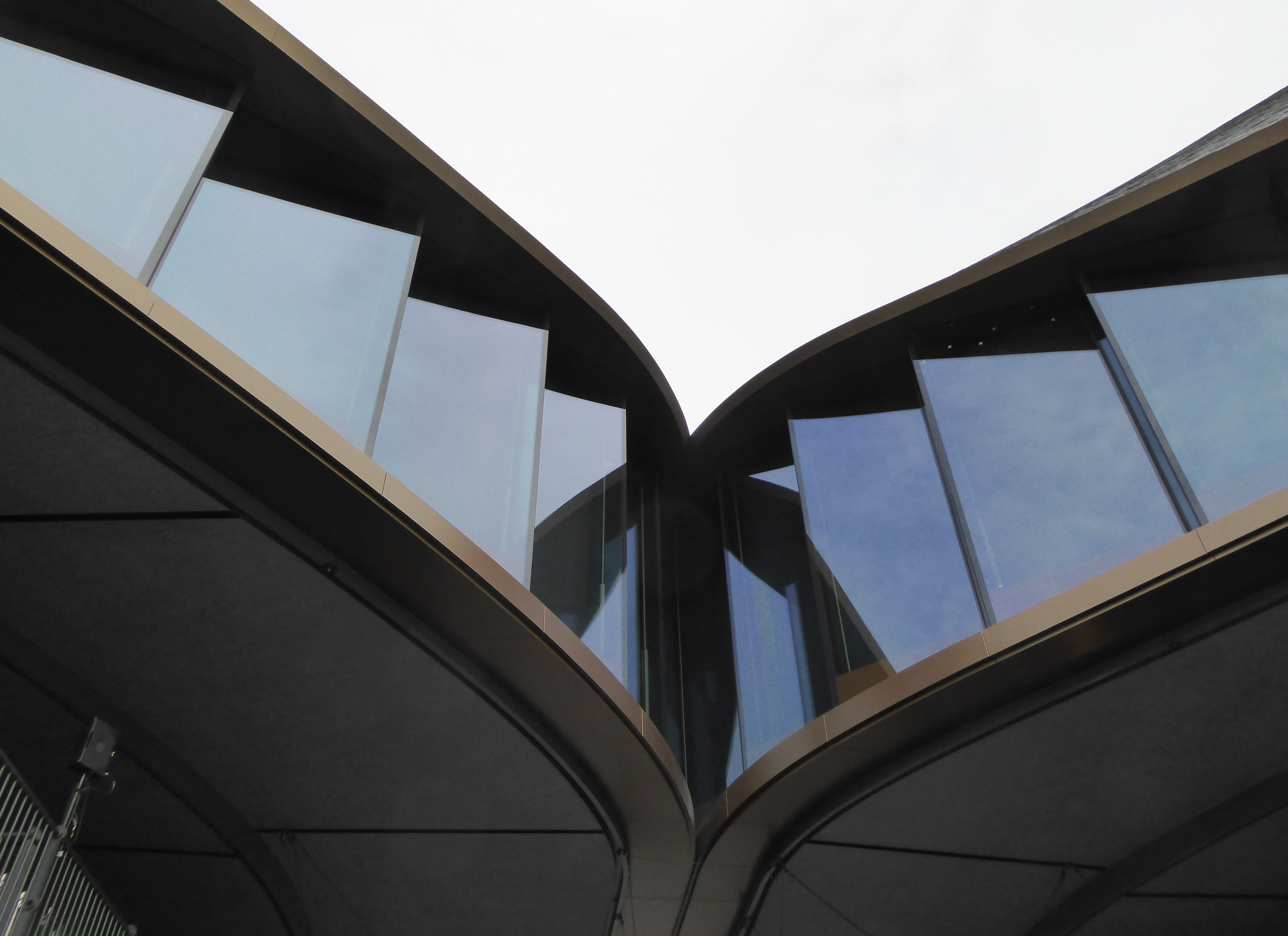
Kissing roof

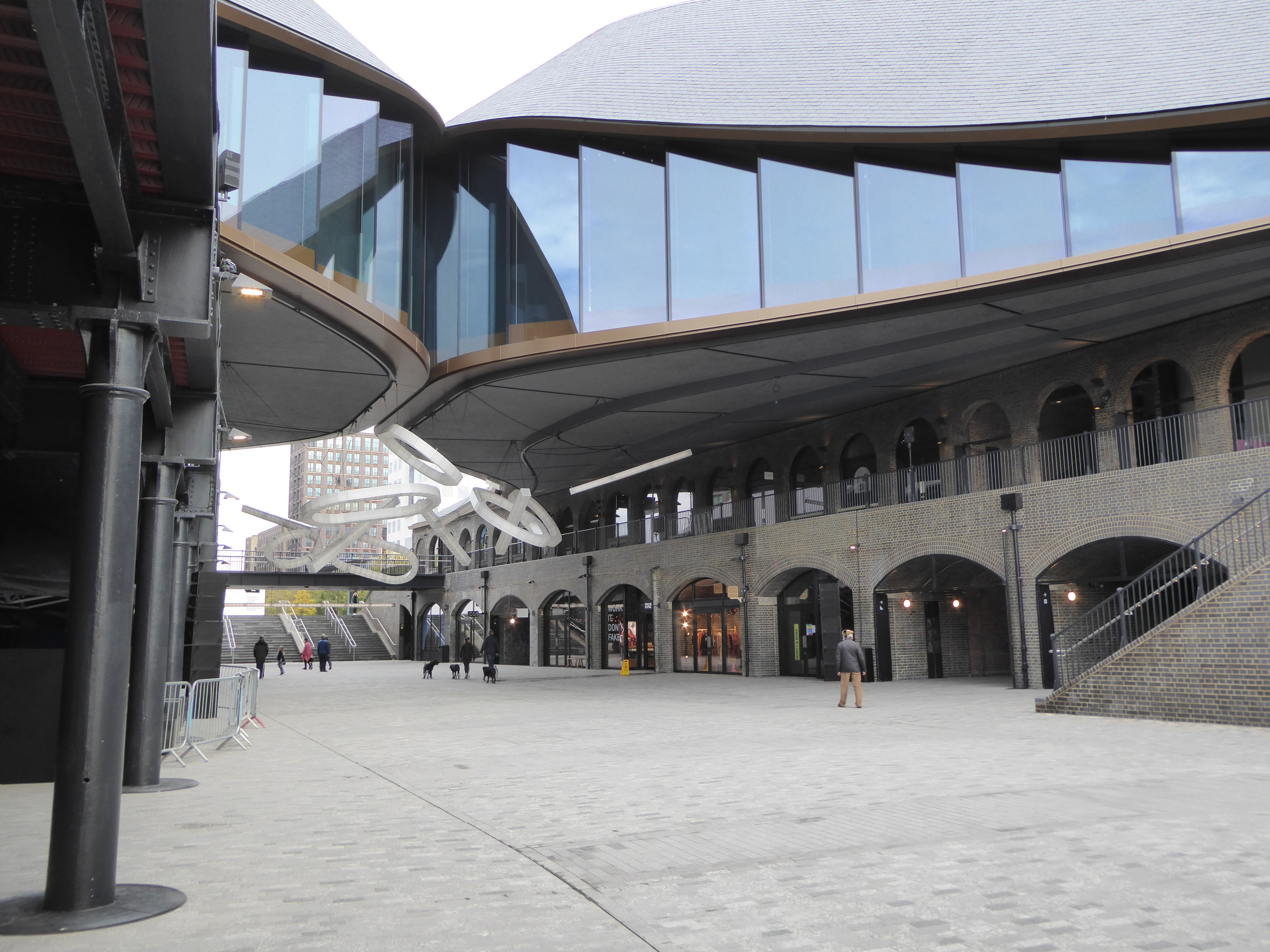
Eastern Coal Drops, looking north

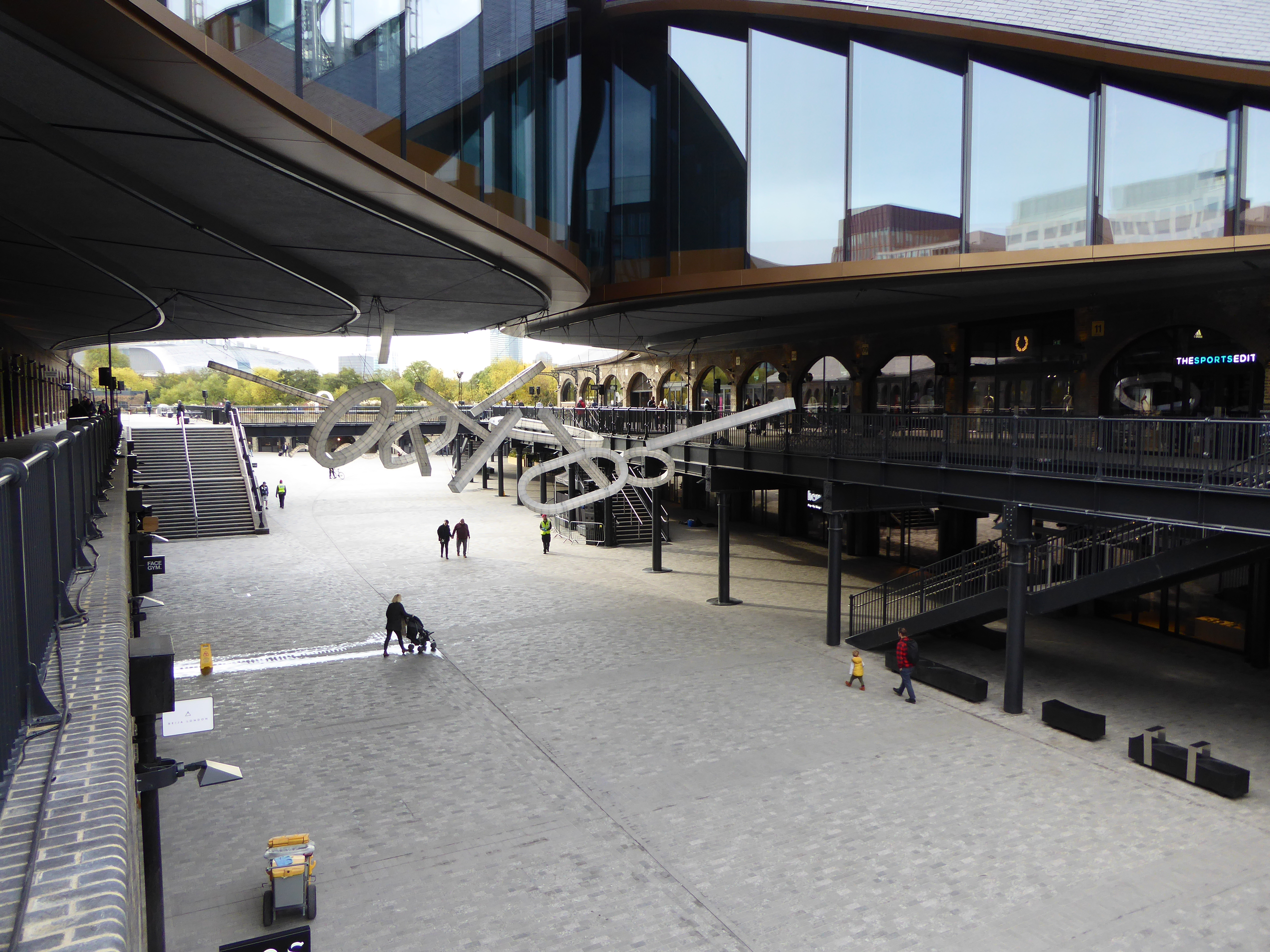
Western Coal Drops, looking south

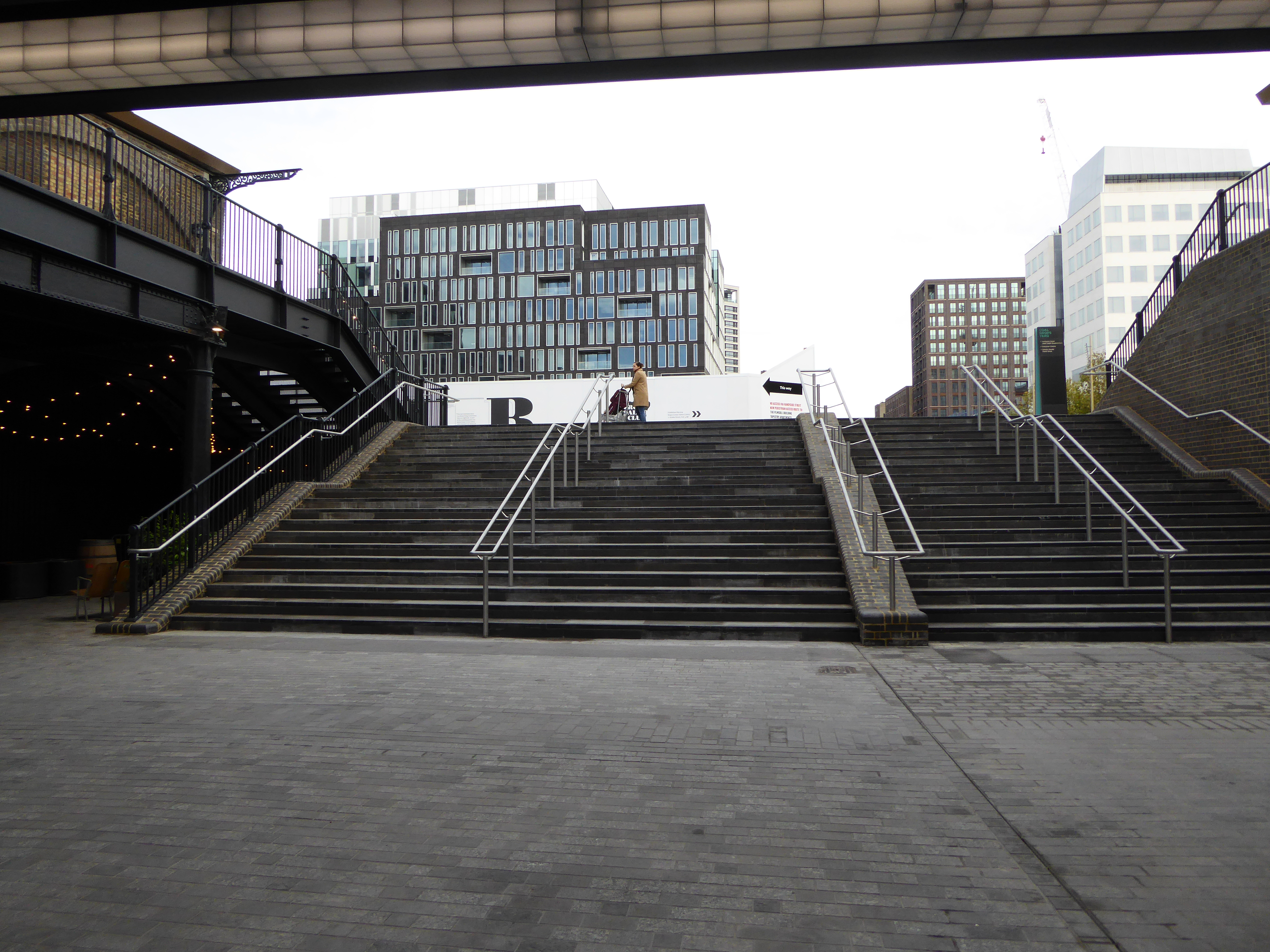
Up to Lewis Cubitt Square

== Awards ==
Coal Drops Yard received the RIBA London Award and RIBA National Award for 2019.

In engineering, it received the Institution of Structural Engineers Award for Structural Transformation for 2019, as well as the Institution of Civil Engineers London branch Bazalgette Award for Sustainability for 2019.
