= Baume (surname) =

Baume, de la Baume and Baumé are French surnames (not to be confused with the German surname Baum). Notable people of these surnames include the following:

- Count Aymar de la Baume Pluvinel (1860–1938), French astronomer
- Camille d'Hostun, duc de Tallard (1652–1728), otherwise Camille d'Hostun de la Baume, duc de Tallard, French diplomat and military commander
- Louise de la Vallière (1644–1710), otherwise Louise-Françoise de la Baume Le Blanc, duchesse de la Vallière, mistress of Louis XIV of France
- Pierre Baume, two individuals
- Antoine Baumé (1728–1804), French chemist
