= King's Cross Central =

Large mixed-use development in central London

Coordinates: 51.53605°N 0.12513°W

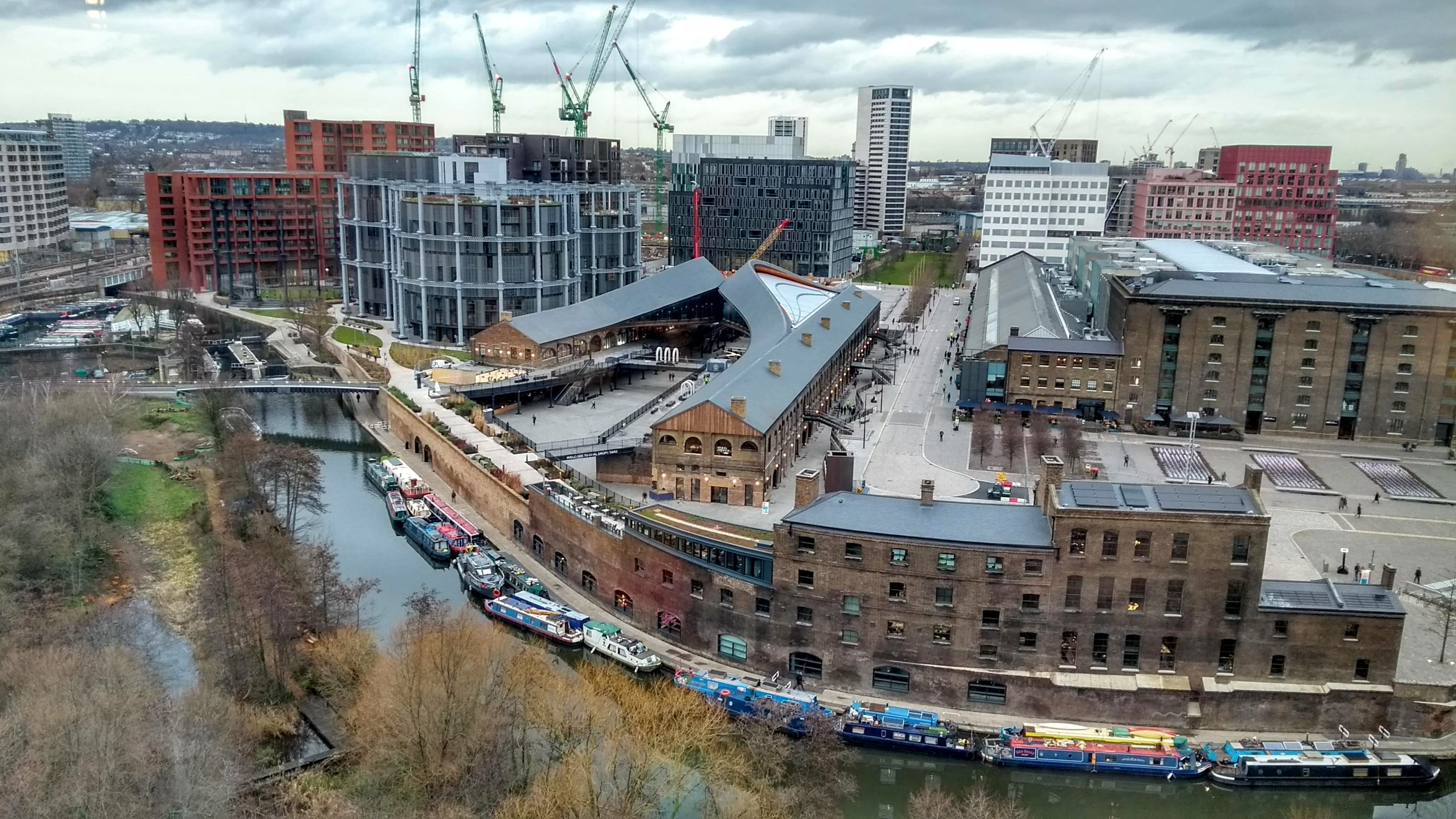
View of the King's Cross Central development, February 2019

King's Cross Central is a large urban mixed-use development in the north of central London. The site is owned and controlled by AustralianSuper (76.4%) and BTPS (23.6%). It consists of approximately 67 acres (27 ha) of former railway lands to the north of King's Cross and St Pancras mainline railway stations. The site is largely determined by three boundaries: the existing East Coast Main Line railway leading out of King's Cross; York Way, a road marking the division between Camden and Islington boroughs; and High Speed 1 (HS1), formerly known as the Channel Tunnel Rail Link, which curves around the site to the north and west.

The master planners for the development were Allies and Morrison, Porphyrios Associates, and Townshend Landscape Architects. The development was approved in 2006 and Related Argent was the main developer. In 2016, the government announced it had sold their investment in Kings Cross Central for £371 million. The final building of the masterplan was approved in the summer of 2023.

== Development ==
The development included 50 buildings, 1,700 homes, 30 bars and restaurants, 10 public parks and squares, and office space providing capacity for 30,000 jobs. Areas were divided into plots, with architects of individual plots guided in terms of how their designs should relate to surrounding architecture and the overall plan. Transforming the area took almost two decades. 20 historic buildings were restored during the development.

In 2011, the listed Granary Building opened. The renovation cost £200 million pounds and Central Saint Martins is based in the building. Pancras Square opened in 2015 and provides office space, with 5 Pancras Square including a library, leisure centre and Camden Council's offices.

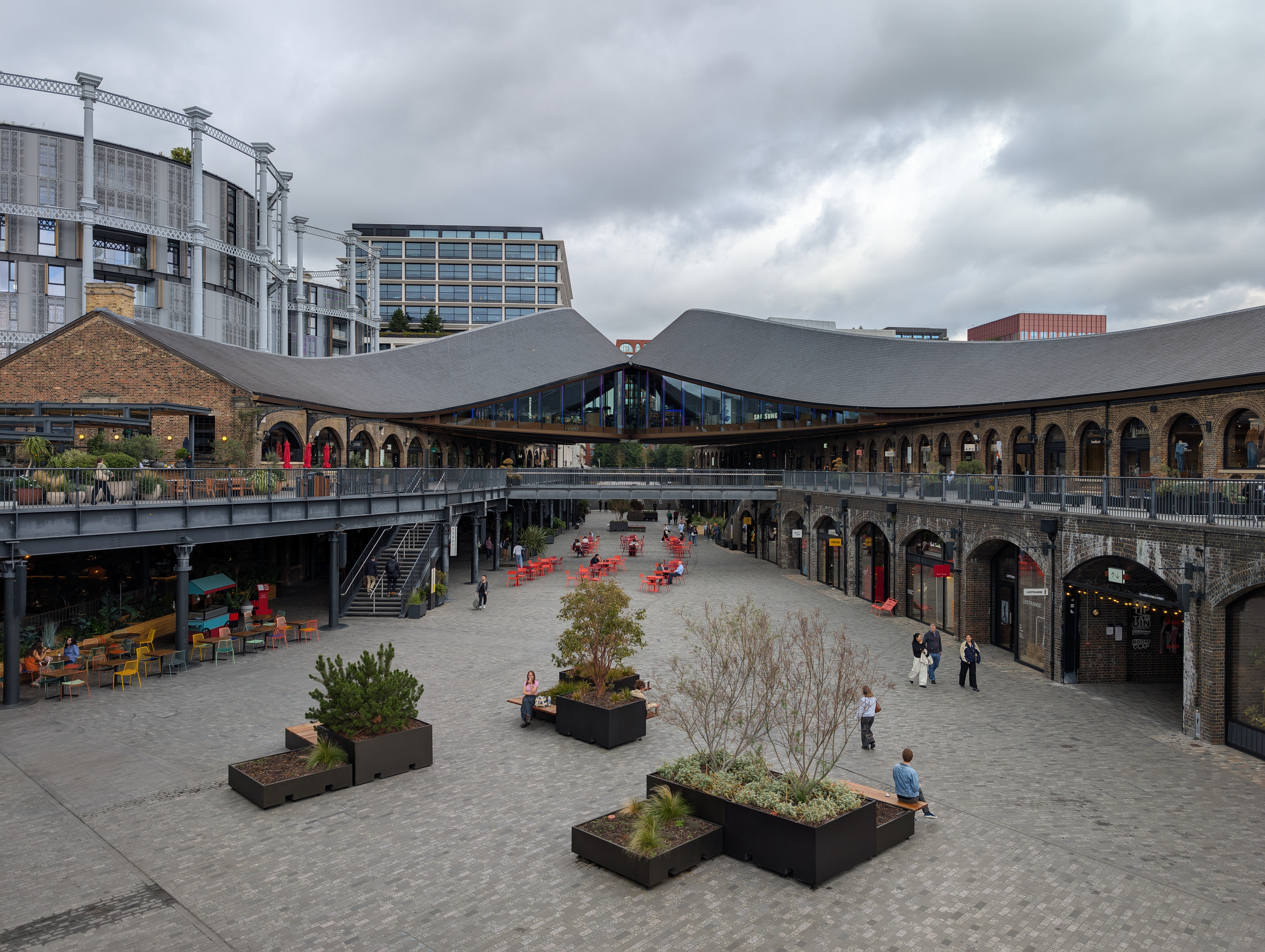
Coal Drops Yard in the retail quarter

Coal Drops Yard was opened in 2018 and is a shopping complex in the development. The structure of the roofs (which extend out) links the two original victorian coal drops buildings, creating the yard. The retail quarter includes 9,300 square metres of retail, dining and event space and has 55 commercial units.

Between 2011 and 2019, the number of jobs in the area had increased from 8,000 to 27,000. By 2020, the number of people living in the area had reached 12,200. By 2022, the number of businesses located in the area had doubled.

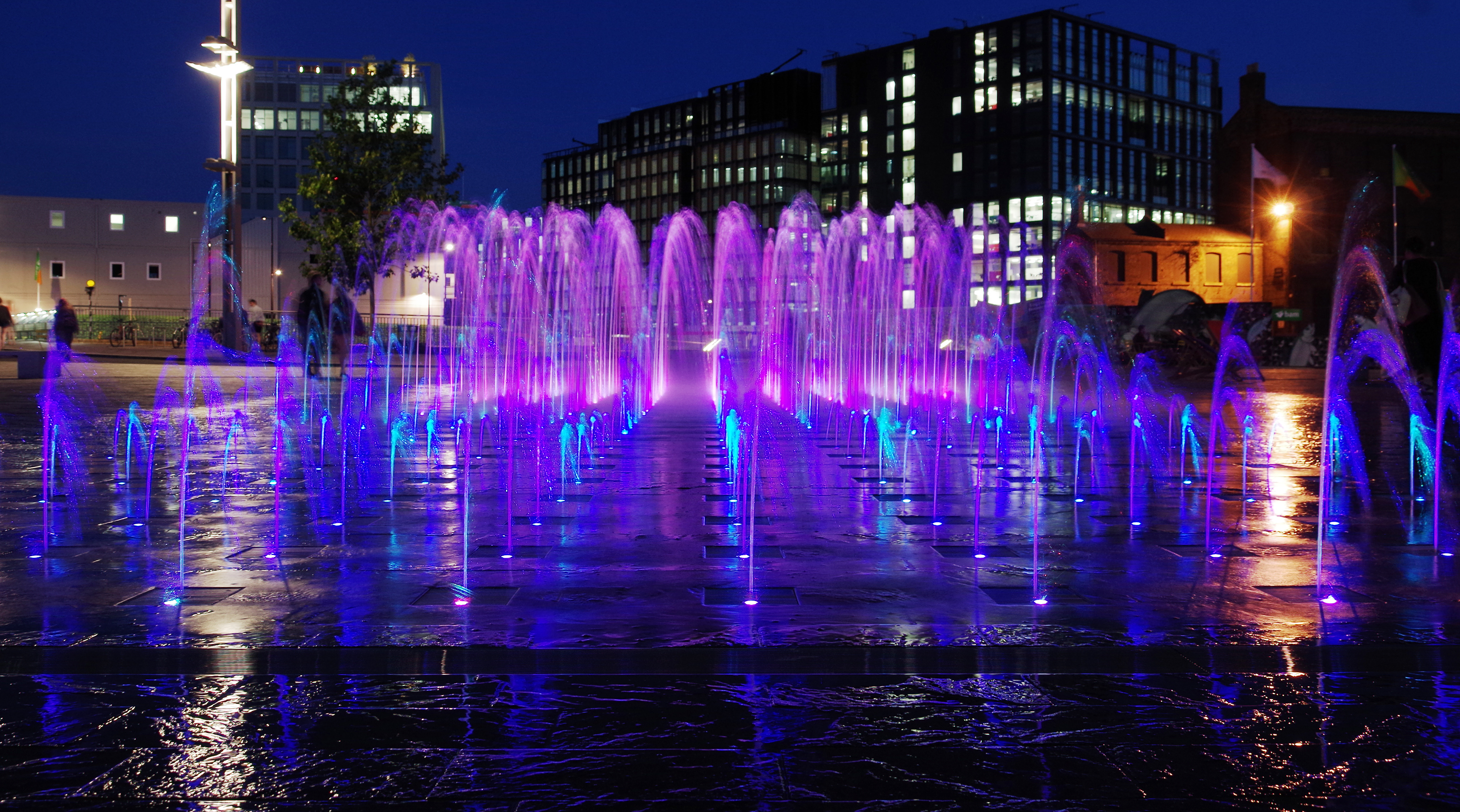
Granary Square water jets lit at night

Granary Square has 1,080 water jets that can be individually controlled, creating a water play area for children, and has hosted art installation exhibitions. Planning permission for the final building that formed part of the masterplan was granted in 2023.

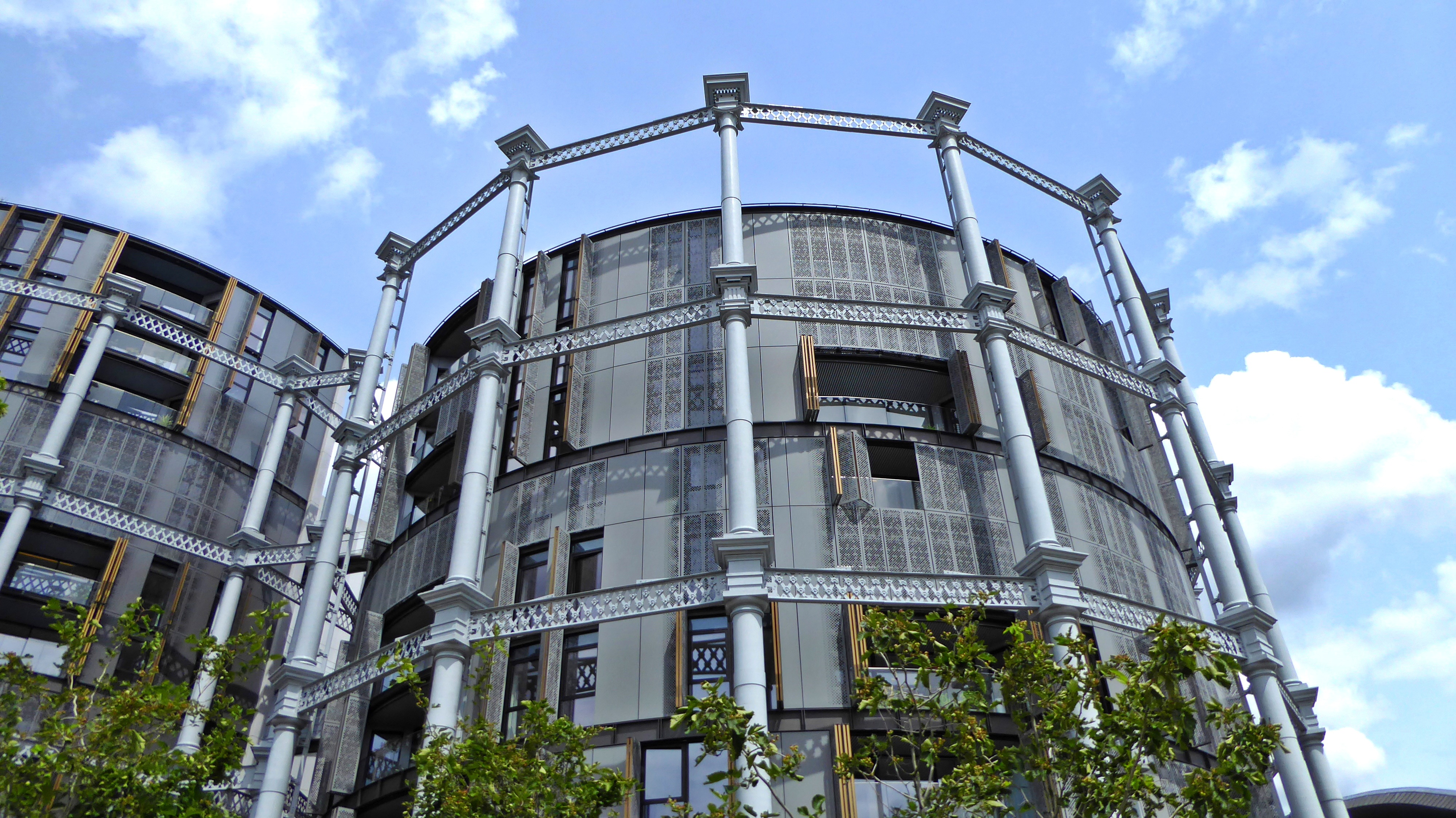
The Triplets Apartments within gasholders

After the gasworks were decommissioned in 2000, gasholders 8, 10, 11, and 12 were taken apart and transported to Shepley Engineers in Yorkshire for restoration, before later forming part of the development. WilkinsonEyre developed apartments within gasholders 10, 11 and 12. A public courtyard area sits within gasholder 8. The apartments are known as the Triplets and the gasholders that surround them are grade II listed.

The land-use mix consists of 47% office space, 25% residential properties, 10% educational premises with the remaining areas used as hotels, retail and leisure/other. The buildings average 8.9 storeys. Sustainability features include a combined heat and power plant that runs off renewable energy and provides heat and hot water and solar panels fitted to roofs of buildings. King’s Cross Central has been certified as carbon neutral.

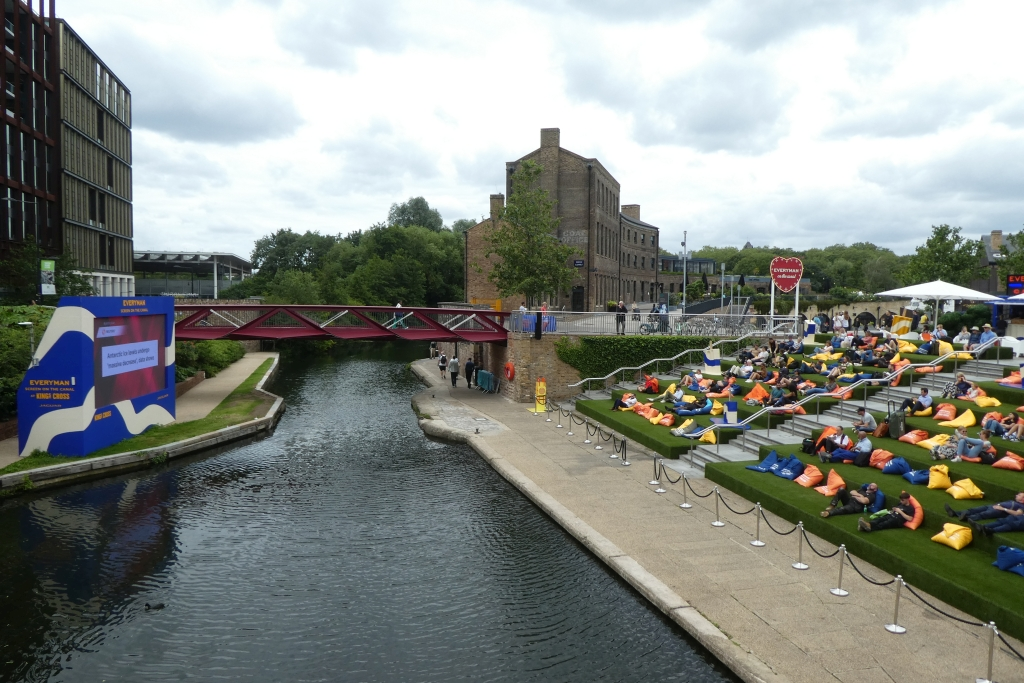
Cinema event by Regents Canal

Related Argent invested in improvements to the canal corridor, notably lighting and access from Granary Square. Everyman on the Canal has hosted events where they have turned an area into an outdoor cinema, screening films and sporting events. About a mile along the towpath to the west is Camden Market, and beyond that Regent's Park and London Zoo; to the east is the Islington Tunnel and then Upper Street, a busy retail and entertainment area. Camley Street Natural Park, Old St. Pancras Church, and Somers Town are now connected to Kings Cross Central by a footbridge called Somers Town Bridge, one of three new crossings over the Regent's Canal.

The estate is owned by KCCLP. In 2016, the UK Government sold their investment to AustralianSuper, a large pension fund, for £371 million pounds. In addition, DHL also sold a 6% stake to the pension fund. Other investors in KCCLP include clients of Federated Hermes.

== Awards ==
London Planning Awards: The Granary Complex won the Mayor's Award for Planning Excellence in 2012.

Royal Academy of Engineering: The engineering and design consultancy Arup won the Major Project Award for their contribution to the redevelopment of King’s Cross Central, in 2014.

New London Architecture Awards: Winner of the masterplan and areas strategies category in 2014.

AJ Architecture Awards: R7 by Morris+Company, in the northern quarter, won best workplace (10,000m² and over) in 2019.

Royal Institute of British Architects: RIBA London Award 2024, RIBA National Award 2024 and shortlisted for the RIBA Stirling Prize 2024.

== Notable residents and businesses ==
The artists Sir Antony Gormley and Vicken Parsons, Lady Gormley live in a converted gasholder in the area.

The surrounding area forms part of London’s Knowledge Quarter, an innovation district that brings together academic, research, and commercial organisations.

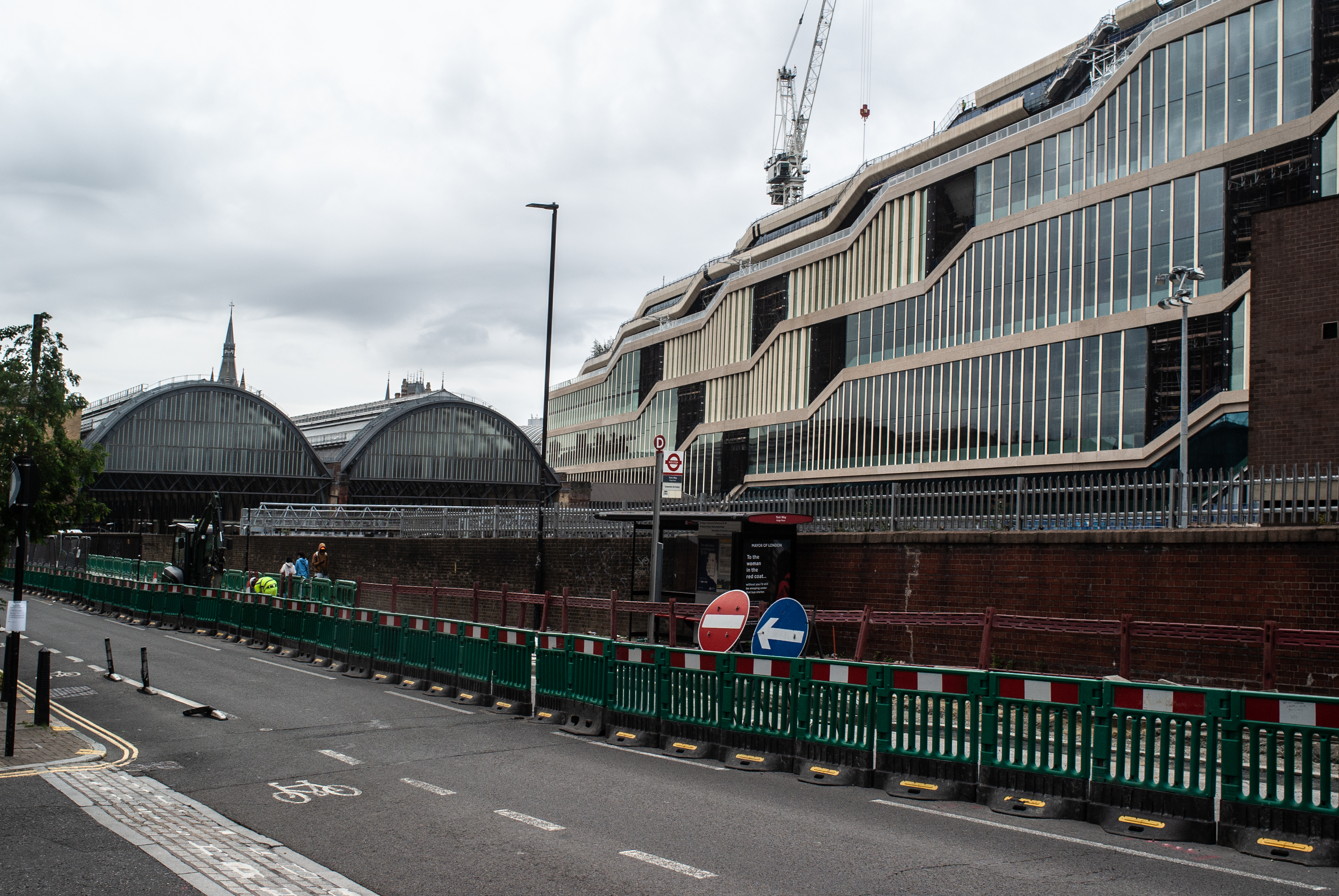
Google's UK headquarters under construction at King's Cross Central

It was announced in January 2013 that Google would acquire a million square feet within King's Cross Central. The building, named Platform 37, is a 330m-long groundscraper with 11 storeys, which took 10 years longer than anticipated to complete. The building was designed by Thomas Heatherwick and Bjarke Ingels.

Havas, the global communications group, consolidated a number of London offices into one new building at Three Pancras Square at Kings Cross Central, where construction completed in 2017. Universal Music Group moved from Kensington to Kings Cross Central in 2018, whilst AstraZeneca moved their headquarters to Kings Cross Central in 2022. Meta are based at 11-21 Canal Reach, in a building designed by Bennetts Associates. They are also based at 10 Lewis Cubitt Square.

A separate development, Kings Place, lies across the road on the east side of York Way. Network Rail and The Guardian newspaper are based there. It also includes two art galleries and concert halls.

== History of site ==
The area of what is today Kings Cross was farmland, intersected by York Way heading north leading to a bridge which crossed the River Fleet at Battlebridge. This name led to a tradition that this was the site of a major battle between the Romans and the Iceni tribe led by Boudica (also known as Boudicea), supported by writings from the ancient Roman historian Publius Cornelius Tacitus.

=== 1820s: Regents Canal ===
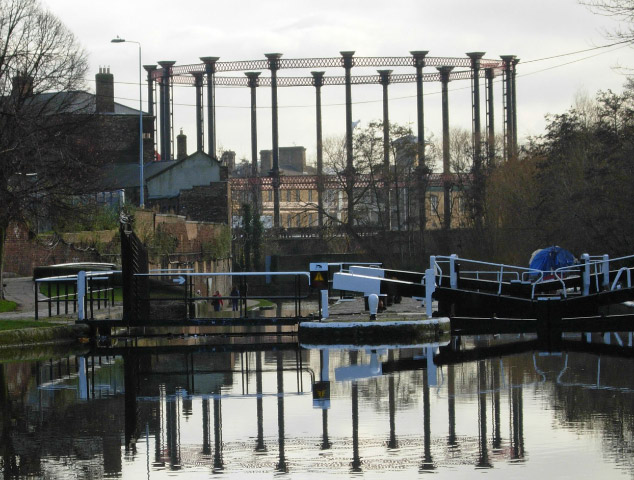
The iconic King's Cross gas holder reflected in the water of the Regent's Canal just above St Pancras Lock

Initially developed as terraced housing, with the opening of the Regents Canal in 1820 the area became industrialised. In 1822 the Imperial Gas Light and Coke Company developed a gas works south of the canal.

=== 1830s: Kings Cross ===
A 60-foot (18 m) high monument topped by an 11-foot (3.4 m) statue of King George IV was built at the junction of Gray's Inn Road, Pentonville Road and New Road, which later became Euston Road. Designed by architect Stephen Geary, the statue was constructed of bricks and mortar, but had the appearance of stone. Described by George Walter Thornbury as "a ridiculous octagonal structure crowned by an absurd statue", the unpopular building was demolished in 1845, though the area kept the name of Kings Cross. A structure in the form of a lighthouse was built on top of a building almost on the site about 30 years later. It is a grade II listed building.

=== Railway stations ===
==== 1849-1852: Great Northern Railway's King's Cross ====
In 1849, the Great Northern Railway (GNR) began development of their East Coast Main Line and station in the area. Purchasing land north of the canal for their goods yard and engine depot, they purchased land south of the canal for their King's Cross railway station. However, with the oncoming Great Exhibition, they decided to open a small temporary two-platform station within the goods area named Maiden Lane railway station. In 1852 the line was completed over the canal and Kings Cross station, designed by architect Lewis Cubitt, opened.

==== 1862-1873: Midland Railway's St Pancras ====
In 1862, the Midland Railway started to develop a London Terminus from Bedford. Surveying for a 49.75-mile (80 km) long line began in October 1862 and it was designed by William Henry Barlow. Construction of a hotel fronting the station, the Midland Grand Hotel, began in 1868, and it opened in 1873; the design of the hotel and station buildings was by George Gilbert Scott.

=== The railway lands ===
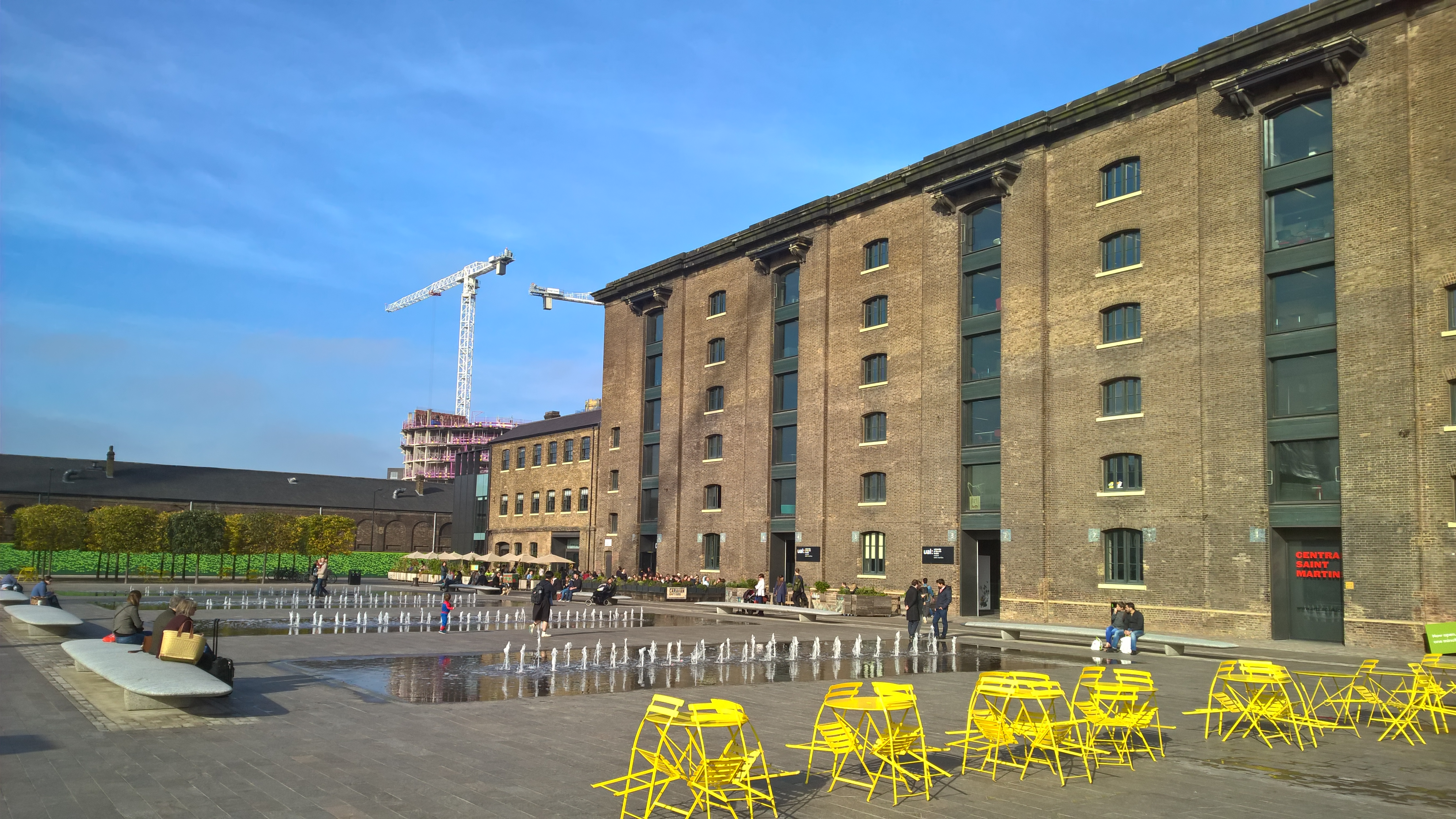
Granary Square, with part of the Eastern Coal Drops visible in the background

Both railway companies had land north of the canal, which due to their previous industrial and commercial use became known as the "railway lands". The company also added the Eastern coal drops (1851), and the later Western coal drops (1860), allowing coal shipments from the Northeast and Midlands to be distributed around London by the canal network, and later by road. In 1888, a canopy was added to provide a sheltered space for potatoes, east of this was a potato market.

=== Post 1945: Decline and clubs ===
After World War II the area declined from being a poor but busy industrial and distribution services district to a partially abandoned post-industrial district. By the 1980s it was notorious for prostitution and drug abuse. Illegal raves started to be put on in the area, before nightclubs including The Cross and Bagley's were located on the site.

== Regeneration and planning ==
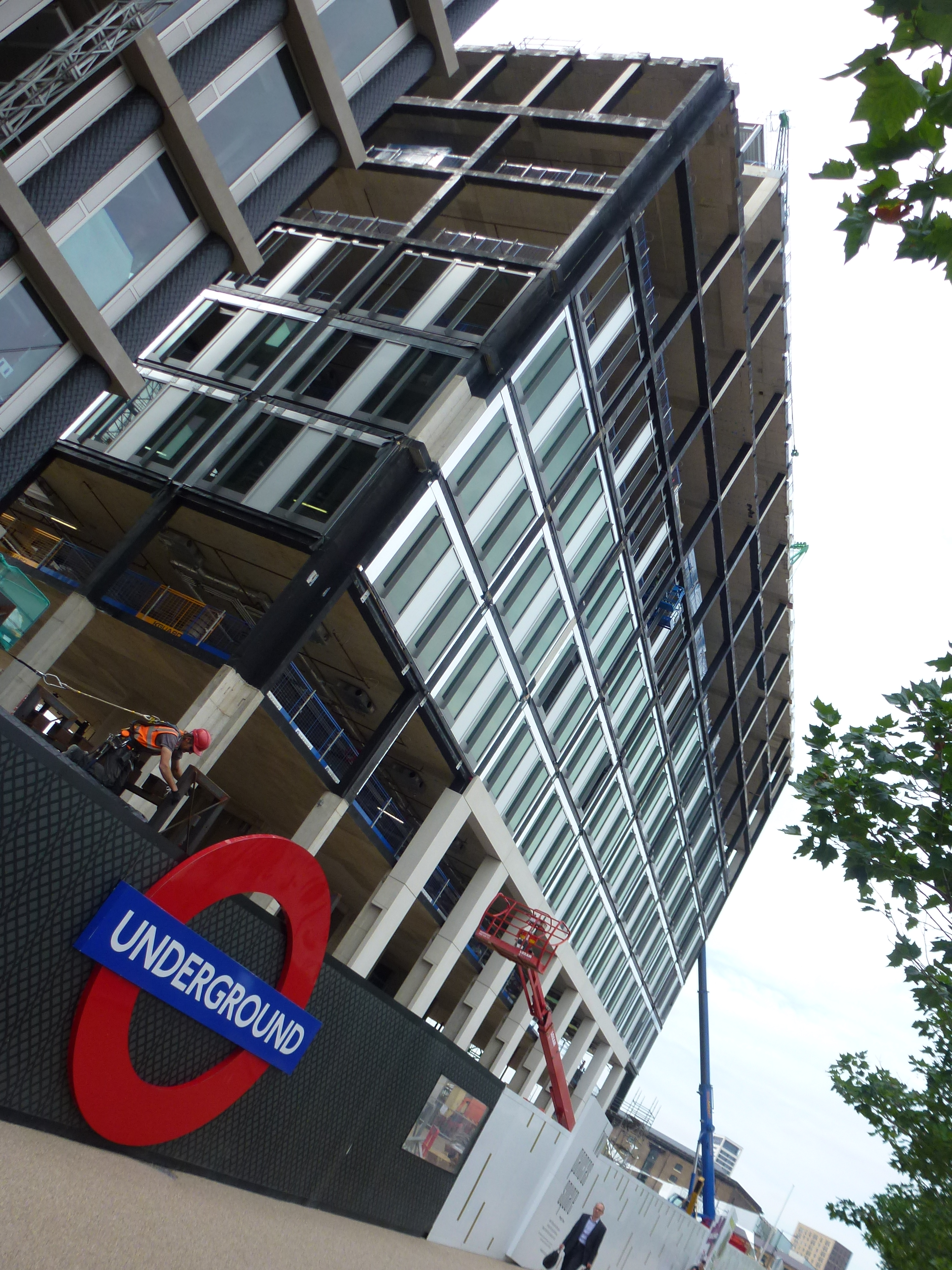
King's Cross Redevelopment in Summer 2013

In 1989, the London Regeneration Consortium (LRC) submitted proposals to develop the railway lands. In the 1990s, the government established the King's Cross Partnership to fund regeneration projects. The regeneration attempts in the 1980s and 1990s failed.

The former Midland Railway goods depot to the west of St Pancras was sold to the British Library. Since 1997 the main collection has been housed in this single building, designed specially for this purpose by the architect Colin St John Wilson. It was the largest public building constructed in the United Kingdom in the 20th century.

The commencement of work on High Speed 1 in 2000 provided a major impetus for wider redevelopment. King’s Cross was identified as an ‘opportunity area’ in the Camden Council Development Plan in 2000, and in the later 2004 London Plan. The majority of the land at King's Cross Central was used for HS1 construction purposes from July 2001 until autumn 2007. The London terminus of the Eurostar international rail service moved to St Pancras station in November 2007 with the station's redevelopment leading to the demolition of several buildings, including the Gasworks.

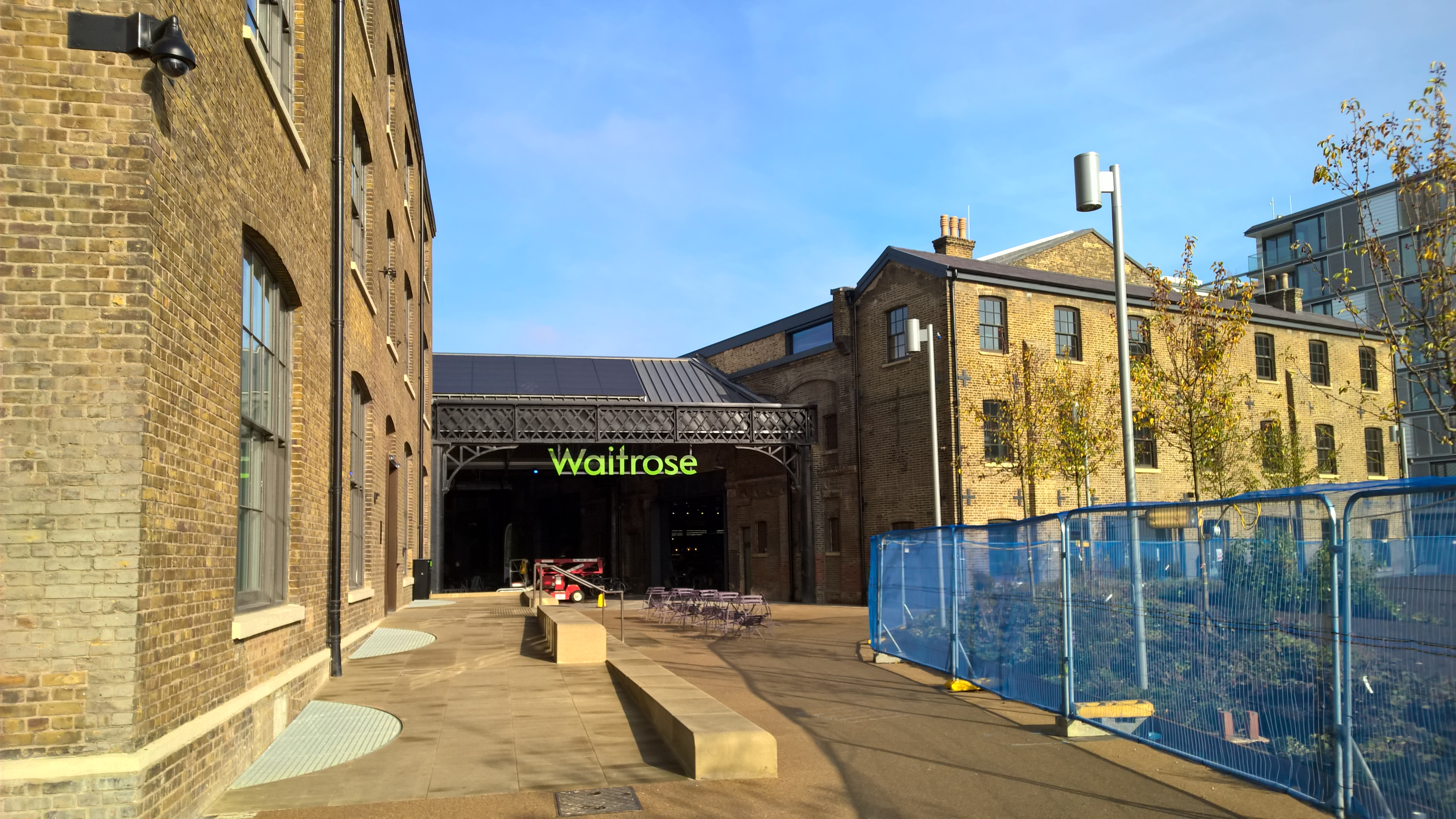
Historic buildings on the site; left to right: 2 Granary Square (former Goods Yard Offices), West Handyside Shelter, Midland Goods Shed (behind its own office building).

The majority of the site falls within two conservation areas. There are several buildings and structures of heritage value, some of which are listed.

=== Proposed development ===
King's Cross Central was identified in national, regional, and local policies as a high density development. It was a brownfield site (i.e. had past industrial use). Buildings proposed ranged from 1 storey to 19 storeys. Protected views of St Paul's from Parliament Hill and Kenwood House were not affected.

At least a third of the site (25 acres/10 hectares) was dedicated to new public routes and open spaces. Related Argent proposed to create 20 new major routes and 10 new privately owned public spaces. Five of these are major new squares - Granary Square, Station Square, Pancras Square, Cubitt Square, and North Square - which together total 8 acres (3.2 ha).

The proposals also included 6.5 acres (2.6 ha) of new public realm along the Regent's Canal (the Gas Holders Zone and Coal Drops Yard) and within a new "Cubitt Park".

Camden Council granted outline planning permission for the main part of the site in early 2006. This was approved by the government and the Mayor of London. A small area of the project, known as the "Triangle Site", fell within the boundaries of Islington. Islington Council initially refused planning permission due to concerns over residential housing suitability and affordable housing levels. There was a public inquiry in 2008, which concluded that the development could proceed.

Detailed planning applications for each part of the site were made on a rolling programme basis. Following completion of the London 2012 Summer Olympics site, King's Cross Central was one of the largest construction projects in Greater London in the first quarter of the 21st century.

== Controversies ==
=== Social housing ===
Related Argent partnered with One Housing Group to provide rented and shared ownership housing units. A 2012 investigation by The Independent and Corporate Watch into the initial allocations found that "people with a history of mental health problems are being excluded from the social housing built there while the developers and local council have also set quotas for the number of homeless and unemployed people" at King's Cross Central's social housing units. Related Argent's planning permission agreement with Camden Council included a commitment to provide 750 social housing properties. Related Argent subsequently asked to reduce the commitment they made for social housing, in order to sell 100 extra luxury flats.

=== Facial recognition system ===
In 2019 the Financial Times reported that Related Argent was using facial recognition software in King's Cross Central. Related Argent had refused to give any detailed information about how the system was being used. The ICO said: "Scanning people's faces as they lawfully go about their daily lives, in order to identify them, is a potential threat to privacy that should concern us all." The Information Commissioner launched an investigation into the matter. Silkie Carlo, of Big Brother Watch commented that "This is inherently a surveillance tool that bends towards authoritarianism".

== Transport links ==
King's Cross/St Pancras is served by six London Underground lines (the Northern, Piccadilly, Victoria, Circle, Metropolitan and Hammersmith & City), by Thameslink, Midland Main Line, East Coast Main Line, and Eurostar. These services, coupled with the ability to access each of the four main airports in the South East (Heathrow, Gatwick, Stansted and Luton airports), make King's Cross the most accessible transport interchange in London. There have been HS1-related works to the London Underground system, in particular works to construct a new Northern Ticket Hall, which opened in 2009. A new Western Ticket Hall was opened to the public on 28 May 2006. Network Rail has redeveloped King's Cross station, relocating the ticket hall and other functions from the former temporary structure which fronted Euston Road.

King's Cross/St Pancras is also well-served by London buses connecting the station to the City of London, the West End, and North London areas such as Islington and Camden. Many buses are available within a short walking distance.

== See also ==
- York Central - similar railway lands brownfield regeneration site, beside York railway station.
- Brent Cross Town - similar North London regeneration project
