= The Cross (nightclub) =

Former nightclub in London, England

Coordinates: 51°32′7.03″N 0°7′36.14″W

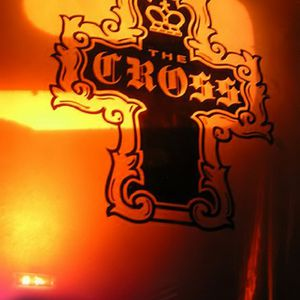
The Cross entrance logo

The Cross was a nightclub in York Way, Coal Drops Goods Yard, King's Cross, London, England between 1993 and 2007, closing on New Year's Day 2008.

The club was started by Billy Reilly and Keith Reilly (the subsequent founder of Fabric), who had originally wanted to open a pre-club drinks bar next to Bagley's nightclub. Camden Council however granted the Reilly brothers a full dance licence and they started hosting club events at the Cross.

== DJs and Venue ==
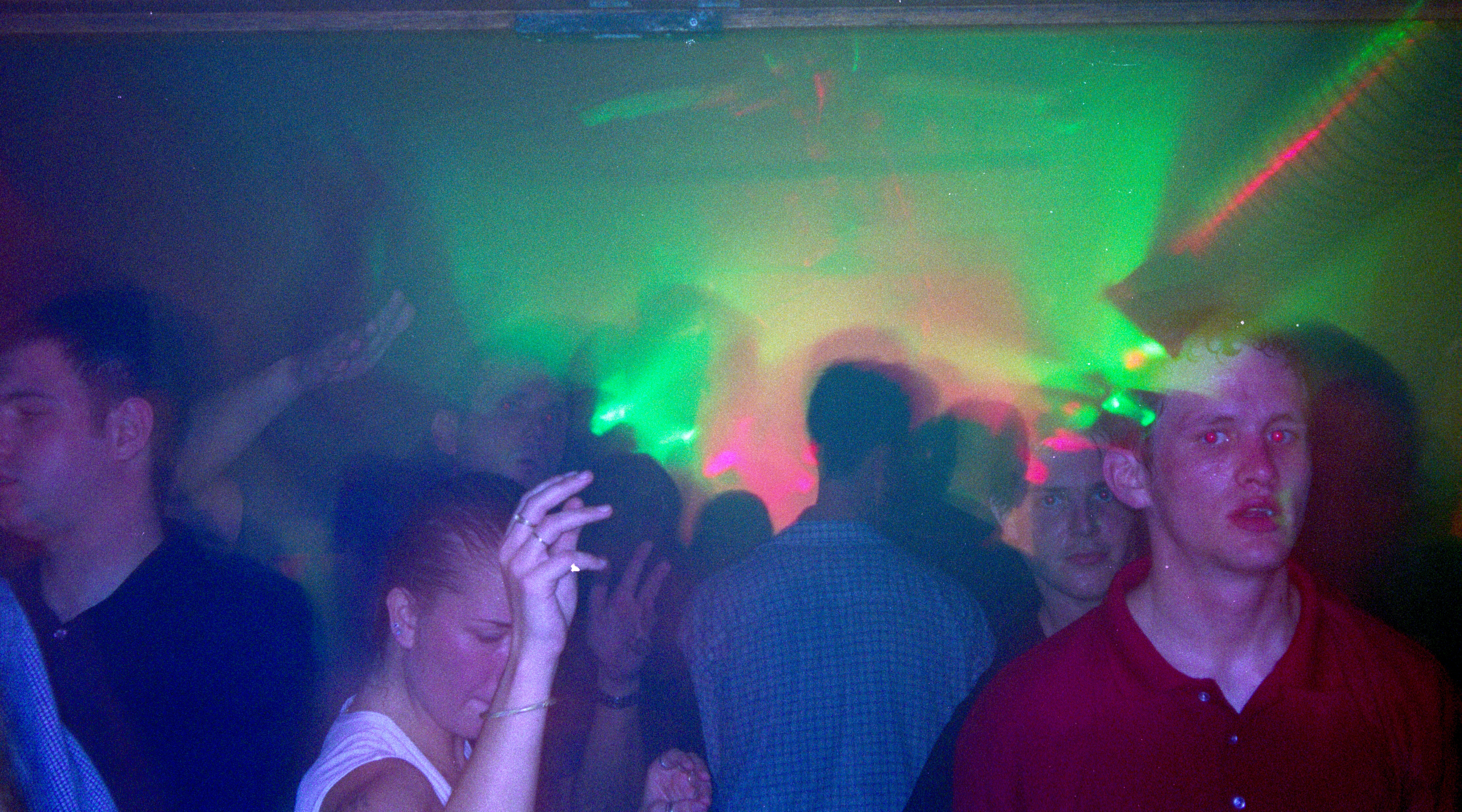
Renaissance at The Cross in 1998, looking into the main arch from the terrace

The Cross was known for long-running monthly promoter residencies, such as Glitterati, the Italian-themed Vertigo and progressive house club night Renaissance. It went on to house two of its most successful residencies Serious & the funky-house-themed Dusted, run by Judge Jules' brother Sam. DJs such as Danny Rampling, Dave Seaman, Ian Ossia, Nigel Dawson, Norman Jay and Judge Jules becoming resident. Paul van Dyk, BT and Tiësto performed there before the height of their fame

The building consisted of a series of refurbished railway arches with connecting corridors and an outdoor terrace. Comprising different dance areas as well as a VIP room and bars. The bar counters were made of steel and frosted glass and the outside terrace area had cobble-stones, palm trees, couches and day-beds.

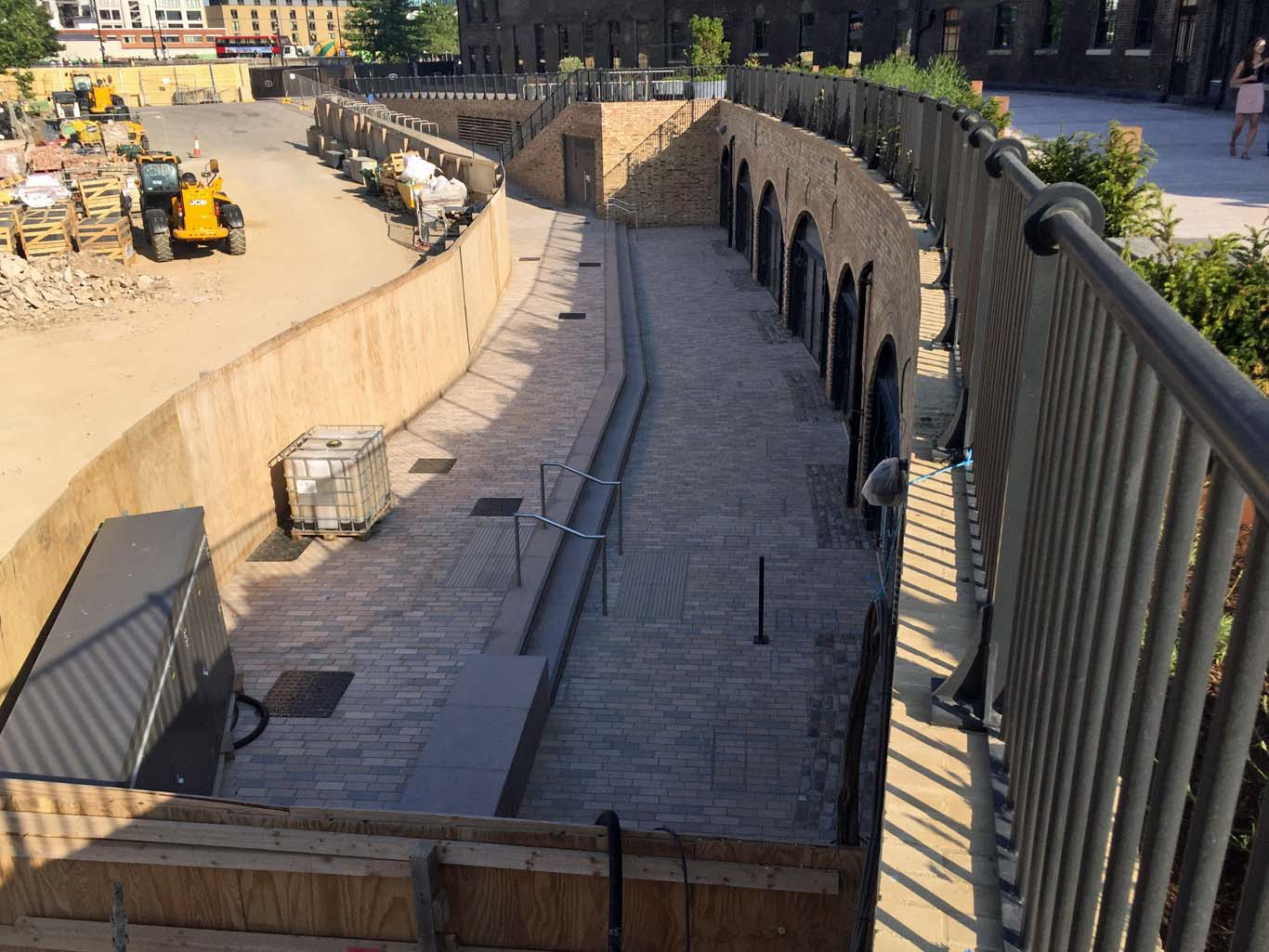
The Cross, post-closure, and site re-development in 2017

By 2008 The Cross' famous Bagley Walk Arches, Coal Drops Yard site had been listed for re-development and club closed.

The site was taken on with the iconic arches left intact by the famous British designer and former club impresario Tom Dixon for his London offices, Showroom, and restaurant which are open to the public.

== Impact ==
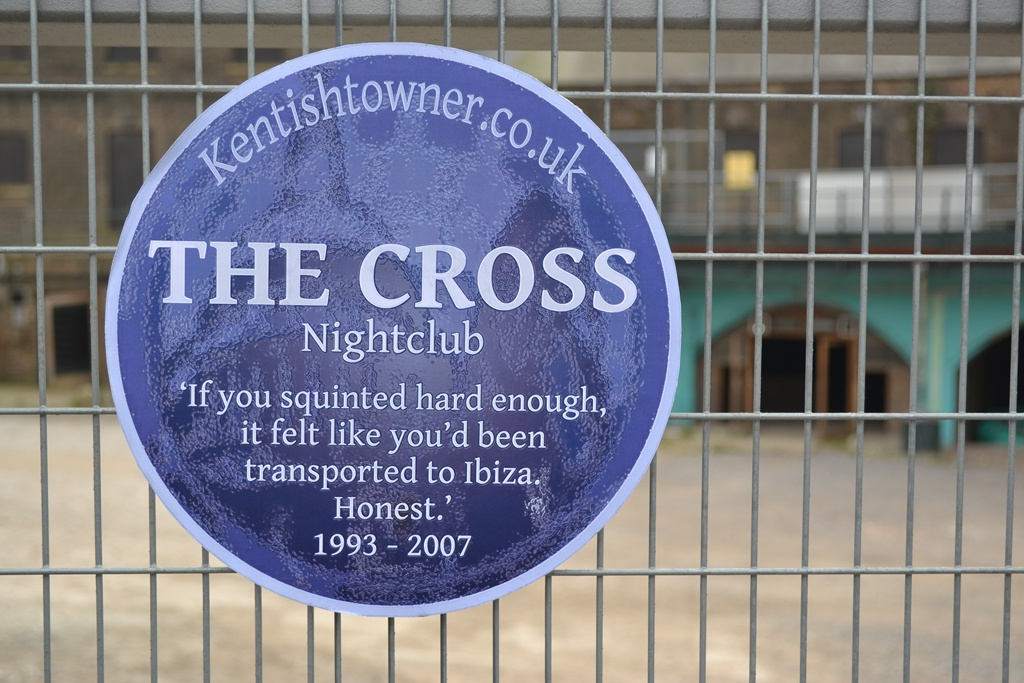
An imitation Blue Plaque commemorating The Cross, as it was being redeveloped.

Looking back over the club's history in 2008, Billy Reilly commented:

In the early days in particular we had the most beautiful people coming to the Cross,’ he says, recalling nights like Glitterati and Cheeky People, L’Amour and Milk ’n’ 2 Sugars. ‘I'd be surrounded by gorgeous girls who’d laugh at my bad jokes and tell me how wonderful I was and I'd look at them and think I'd died and gone to heaven. You've got to remember, one Saturday I had a garage and no one wanted to talk to me, the following week I had a club and everybody wanted to be my friend. You could make a film about it: from oily fingers and overalls, suddenly it was Patrick Cox and furry trousers.

== 2022 Reopening ==
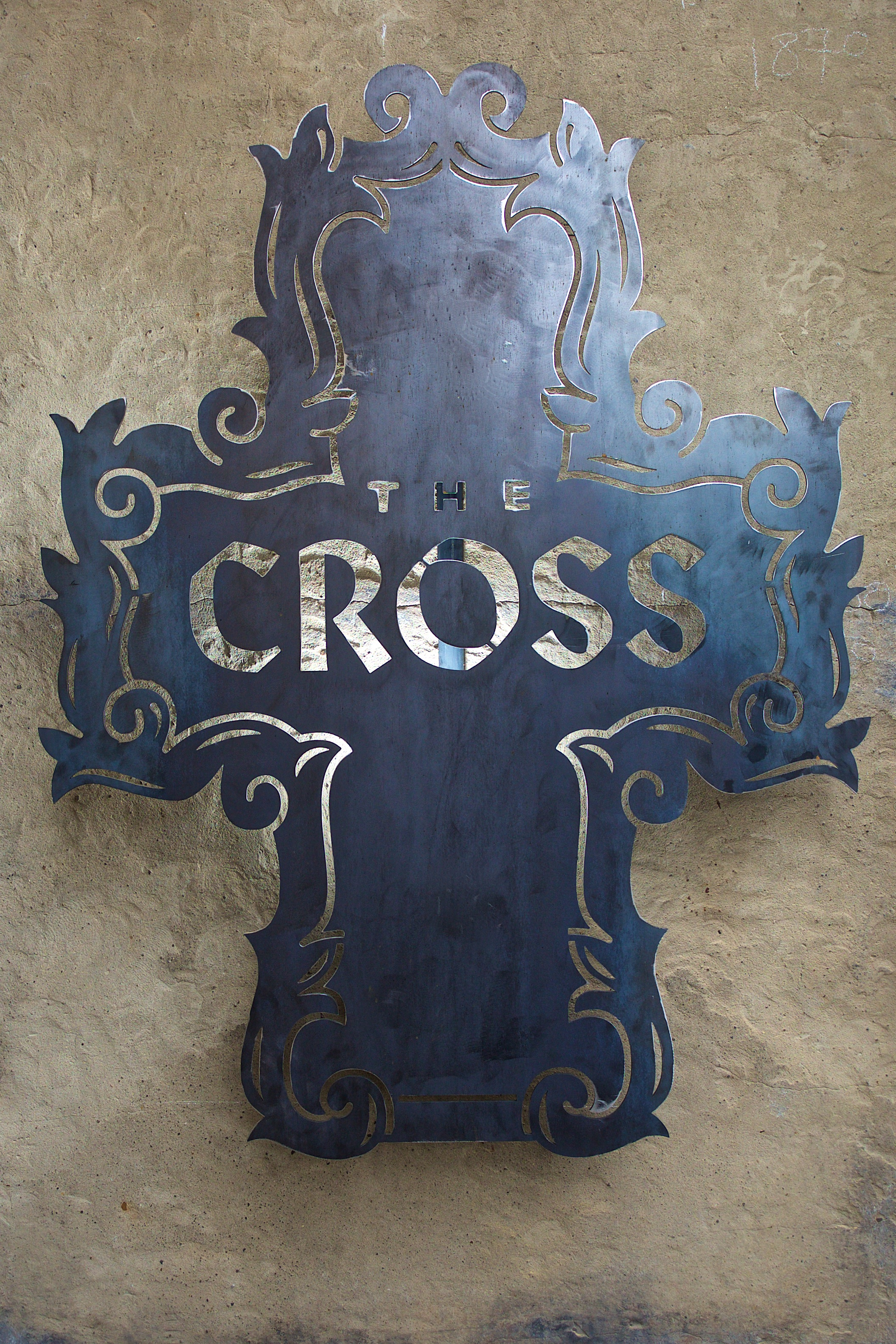

The Cross reopened as a pub on 9 September 2022, close to the site of the club. Owned by original founder Billy Reilly, Managing Director Gemma Reilly commented:

"As well as a rooftop bar, a lounge and a restaurant, the new spot will include a club in the basement. "The Cross has grown up," Gemma told Camdenist. "The new venue brings some of the heritage and nostalgia elements, in that it's still right here in King's Cross [and] the club was six arches and now its six floors, but we're also making sure that we're getting the best quality marble fittings and designer upholstery throughout. Nothing too flashy, in keeping with the low-key feel of the original, but I really think London is crying out for something like this: a place where you can go to drink, dine and dance."
