= James Edwin Baum =

American journalist

- Born: November 15, 1887; Lincoln, Nebraska, US
- Died: December 1, 1955 (aged 68); Palm Beach, Florida, US
- Occupation(s): Journalist and big-game hunter

James Edwin Baum (November 15, 1887 – December 1, 1955) was an American journalist and big-game hunter. After running away from home he worked as a wrangler before finding employment as a reporter at the Omaha Daily Bee. After a stint with the Chicago Daily News and an investment firm Baum served as a pilot during World War I. He worked as a cattle rancher after the war and at the Chicago Evening Journal. Baum rejoined the Chicago Daily News in 1925 and accompanied the paper's 1926–27 Abyssinia expedition during which he shot big game specimens for the Field Museum of Natural History. Afterwards he wrote several fiction and non-fiction books and undertook other expeditions for the museum.

== Biography ==
James Edwin Baum was born in Lincoln, Nebraska on November 15, 1887. At the age of 14 he ran away from home and freighthopped to Wyoming where he found work as a wrangler. Baum worked as a reporter at the Omaha Daily Bee from 1908 to 1914, apart from a brief period in 1910 when he attended Princeton University. He was afterwards hunting and fishing columnist for the Chicago Daily News and in 1914 worked for an investment firm in Boston.

Baum served as a pilot during World War I and afterwards, from 1919 to 1922, was a cattle rancher in Wyoming. He was president of the Chicago Brick Company in 1923 and a reporter at the Chicago Evening Journal until 1925. In 1925 he returned to the Chicago Daily News and, with Louis Agassiz Fuertes, planned the newspaper's 1926–27 expedition to Abyssinia. The expedition was a joint venture with the Field Museum of Natural History and Baum's role was to hunt big game for the museum's African dioramas. He wrote the book Savage Abyssinia about the expedition in 1927 and updated this as Unknown Ethiopia in 1935.

Baum later hunted big game in Alaska and undertook a number of other expeditions for the Field Museum. He wrote the fiction works Stepping Ahead of the Bank Crook in 1925, Spears in the Sun in 1928, Gold and a Girl in 1929 and Adventures of Gilead Skaggs in 1941. In retirement Baum spent his summers in Lake Forest, Illinois, and winters in Palm Beach, Florida. He died in a hospital in Palm Beach on December 1, 1955.
