= Baum test =

Psychological test developed by Karl Koch

Baum test (also known as the "Tree test" or the "Koch test") is a projective test that is used extensively by psychologists around the world. "Baum" is the German word for tree. It reflects an individual's personality and their underlying emotions by drawing a tree and then analyzing it.

== History ==
In 1952, Karl Koch interpreted patterns according to principles of handwriting analysis after asking the subject to draw a tree. He attributed the method to Emil Jucker, who clinically analyses the forms of trees. The contents it analyzed include the size of trees, the elements of trees (trunk, crown, branches), the ground and the prosperity of trees. The Baum test is used as a clinical method for personality testing and expressing conflicts, especially for assessing personality in the developmental age. Nowadays, the Baum test is also used in clinical research like diagnosing cognitive disorder.

== Process ==
The first step is to let the participant draw a tree on a paper. In some cases, participants are also asked to write a short essay about the drawn tree. A psychologist or a psychiatrist will then evaluate the various aspects of the drawing as well as the individual's behavior or comments while completing the test. The evaluation is based on standard criteria and scored from "very immature" to "very mature" while the essay is graded from advanced, normal, and backwards.

== Indications ==
It is suggested by J.H. Plokker that the type of tree an individual draws relates to the structure of the psyche or unconscious itself or that it symbolizes one's personality as it can project self-image.

According to Koch and Jucker, they focus on interpreting parts of trees. Here is the analysis raised by them:

- Large Baum: indicates self-confidence
- Small Baum: indicates a lack of self-confidence
- Big trunk: indicates straightforwardness and liveliness
- Small trunk: indicates weariness
- Deep Roots: indicates stability
- No/shallow roots: indicates a feeling of exclusion
- Big Branches: indicates arrogance
- No/small branches: indicates unsocial behavior
- Large Leaves: indicates friendliness, social ability
- Small Leaves: indicates shyness

== Forms of analysis ==
Two forms of analysis are used to evaluate and interpret the Baum test.

1. The global structure analysis sees the tree as a whole; for example, the tree's overall size and location on the paper.
2. The internal structure, raised by Emil Jucker, focuses on the analysis of finer details of the tree. There are 59 detail oriented aspects of the tree drawing that are used to evaluate an individual's thoughts or feelings, including roots, trunk, branches, crown, leaves, knots, shading, symmetry, archetypal features, etc.

== Research and applications ==
=== Uses in Cross-cultural psychology ===
Since drawing is nonverbal character, it has effectively overcome the language barriers in different countries. In 1966, Wayne Dennis analyzed children's drawings and found that they are great indicators of group values and cognitive functioning Though familiarity is a factor children choose to depict, they would also draw things they valued (wishes and desires). He concluded that drawing as a projective technique provides children with a good opportunity to express their personal feelings and their attitudes towards others and their environment. Research conducted in 2007 encouraged people who work with young people to use drawing as a child-centered procedure and evaluation tool, though during the process of interpretation expect a level of subjectivity.

=== Uses in personality psychology ===
This projective test is also used for reflecting human personality constructs, while it is an introspective, self-report questionnaire. It represents the unconsciousness of personality and the assessment by responding to a stimulus (drawing the tree). According to Ursula Avé-Lallemant, the size of the tree and the width of the trunk symbolize "a sense of self-expression and the amount of mental energy". The position of a tree symbolizes "how one perceives and relates to the mental space and time in which one lives."

=== Uses in diagnosis of mental disorders ===
There are many conducted research which provide evidence of the Baum test. Roberto and his colleagues researched the Baum test with a group of mild cognitively impaired (MCI) patients and controls. By comparing their tree-drawing test with the control groups, they found that the trunk-to-crown ratio of trees drawn by MCI is greater than controls, while their size of trees is significantly smaller than controls. This indicates its inverse relationship with the ability to use language, which also supported by previous studies. One research on Alzheimer's disease also shown the difference in drawing patterns. By founding the MCI drawn trees are different from those drawn by healthy subjects with a progressive differentiation from degrees of cognitive impairment, it suggests the Baum test could help make diagnosis of cognitive related diseases.

Another recent implication of Baum test is for diagnosing depression disorders. It has found statistical significance difference in canopy widths. Besides, it could help to find the characteristics of eating disorders. Researcher measured the height and width of the trunk and the crown and details of how drawings were processed.

== Advantages and limitations ==
The advantages of the Baum test are that it can be administered quickly (5–10 minutes), is suitable for both individual and group testing, and that it offers the clinician an opportunity to observe the patient's motor skills.

Additionally, as a nonverbal tool for psychodiagnosis, it provides personality information for psychotherapy without causing trauma to the subject.

However, researchers have pointed out that, like other projective tests, the Baum test lacks scientific evidence supporting its analysis. The methods of analysis depend on individual subjective judgement. Additionally, the test is typically not used on patients with very low IQs because their drawings tend to be quite meager.

== Gallery ==
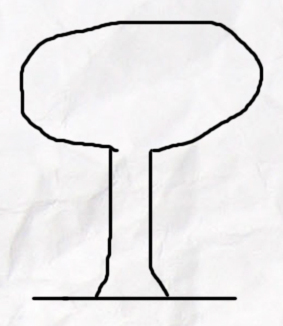
Drawing of a tree with a flattened crown.

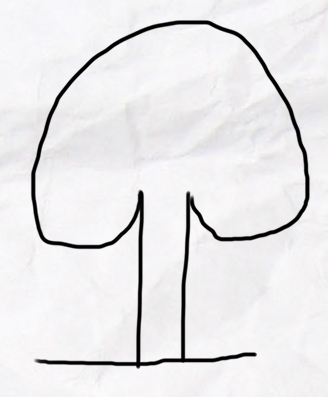
Drawing of a tree with a falling crown.

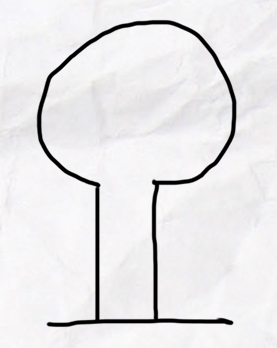
Drawing of a tree with a circular crown.

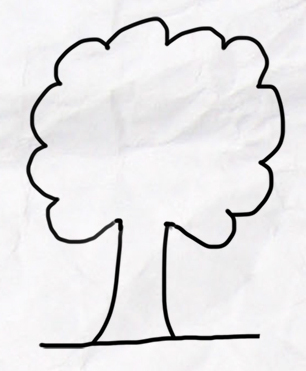
Drawing of a tree with spreading crown.

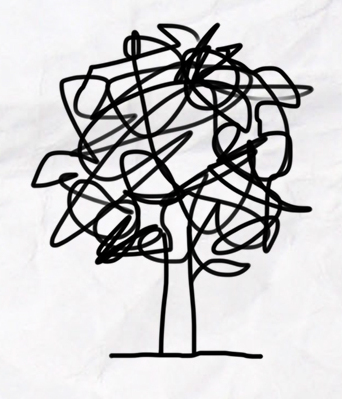
Drawing of a tree with disorderly crown.

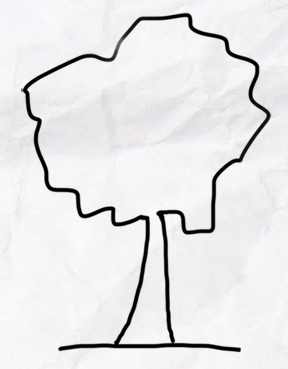
Drawing of a tree with irregular crown.

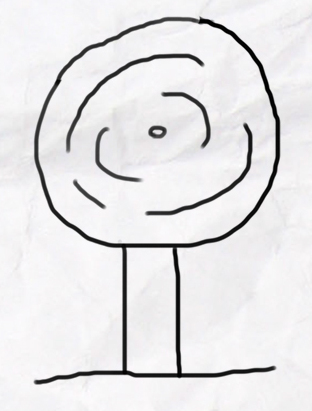
Drawing of a tree with a concentric circles crown.

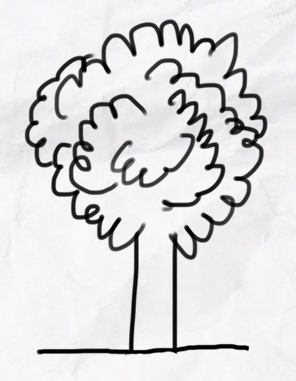
Drawing of a tree with curly crown.

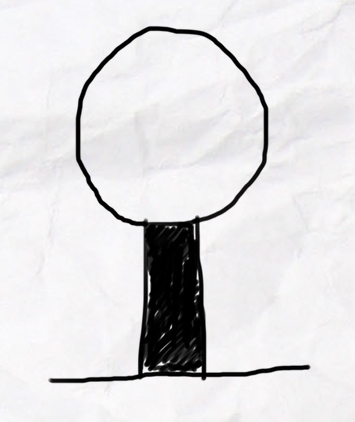
Drawing of a tree with a filled-in trunk.

== See also ==
- projective test
- personality test
- tree testing
