= Frank Baum (footballer) =

German footballer

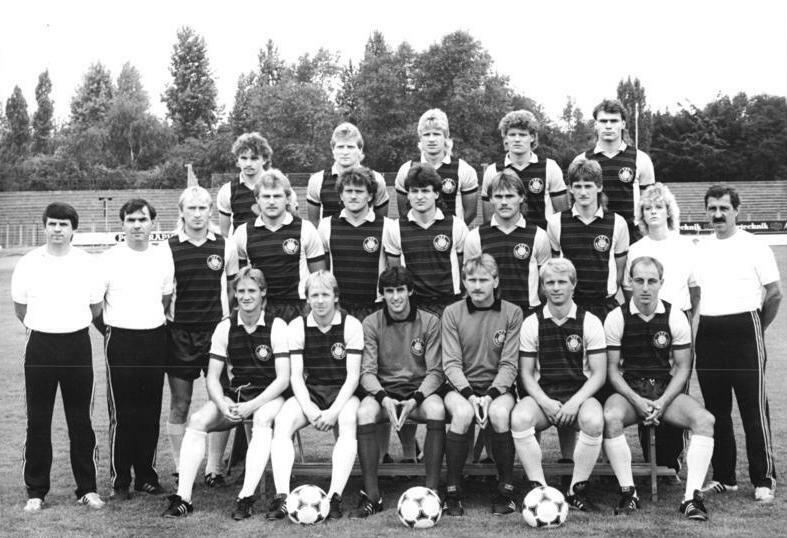
- Frank Baum (front row, first from right) with 1. FC Lokomotive Leipzig in 1988

Personal information
- Full name: Frank Baum
- Date of birth: 30 January 1956 (age 70)
- Place of birth: Zwenkau, Bezirk Leipzig, East Germany
- Position: Defender

Senior career*
Years	Team	Apps	(Gls)
1963-1968	BSG Aktivist Zwenkau		
1968-1974	1. FC Lokomotive Leipzig		
1974-1979	BSG Chemie Leipzig		
1979-1989	1. FC Lokomotive Leipzig		
1989-1990	BSG Chemie Böhlen		
1990-1992	FC Sachsen Leipzig		
1992-1995	VfB Zwenkau		
1995-1997	SV LVB Leipzig		

International career
1979-1984	East Germany	17	

Managerial career
- 1995-1997: SG LVB Leipzig (player-coach)
- Kickers 94 Markkleeberg
- 2003-: SG LVB Leipzig
- * Club domestic league appearances and goals

Olympic medal record

Representing East Germany

Men's Football
Silver medal – second place	1980 Moscow	Team competition

Frank Baum (born 30 January 1956) is a retired German soccer-player, who played as a defender for several German soccer-clubs and the East Germany national soccer-team between 1963 and 1997.

Baum spent his youth playing for BSG Aktivist Zwenkau and 1. FC Lokomotive Leipzig. Between 1974 and 1979 Baum played for BSG Chemie Leipzig and by the 1978-79 season was a regular first-team player. On 28 February 1979 he gained his first cap for East Germany in a 1-0 loss to Bulgaria. The same year saw Baum transfer to city rivals Lokomotiv Leipzig, where he played for the next ten years. Following the transfer, he won the FDGB Pokal three times and played the European Cup. He was part of the team who reached the final of the 1986-87 UEFA Cup Winners' Cup in Athens, losing 1-0 to AFC Ajax.

In total, Baum played in 248 games in the DDR-Oberliga, scoring ten goals.

Between 1979 and 1984 he made 17 appearances for East Germany. He won a silver medal in the 1980 Olympics in Moscow with the GDR Olympic team.

After leaving Lokomotive Leipzig in 1989, Baum had spells at Chemie Böhlen, Sachsen Leipzig and VfB Zwenkau.

Baum became first-team player-coach at SV LVB Leipzig and also coached Kickers 94 Markkleeberg in 1995. Currently, he is coaching the men's first team of the Leipzig Transport Authority team in the Leipzig District League.

== Honors ==
- FDGB Pokal champion: 1981, 1986, 1987 (1. FC Lokomotive Leipzig)
- UEFA Cup Winners' Cup runners-up: 1987 (1. FC Lokomotive Leipzig)
- Olympic silver medal: 1980 (East Germany)
