= Pierre Henri Joseph Baume =

French socialist (1797–1875)

Pierre Henri Joseph Baume (1797–1875) was a French socialist, active in England.

== Life ==
Baume was born at Marseille. When he was still young, his father moved to Naples and the boy was placed in a military college there. In his eighteenth year, he became private secretary to King Ferdinand. He left the Kingdom of the Two Sicilies and came to England about 1825, where he associated with the advocates of social change. In 1832, he took out letters of naturalisation. He was, in succession, a preacher of the doctrine of 'reforming optimism,’ a theatrical manager, the curator and proprietor of some 'model experimental gardens' near Holloway, and a promoter in Manchester of public-houses without intoxicating drinks.

For many years, Baume's mind was bent upon the establishment of a major educational institute, on a communistic basis. To carry out this project, he denied himself. He acquired a large estate, valued at £40,000, at Colney Hatch, and another in Buckinghamshire, estimated to be worth £4,000. Obstacles presented themselves and he gave up his plan. During the Owenite socialist agitation his oratory, and power of devising astonishing placards and proclamations, made him a notable man. A boy whom he had adopted was publicly 'named' by Owen. He was believed to have amassed a fortune as a foreign spy, and his mysterious ways added to his reputation.

For several years, Baume resided in Manchester, where he organised Sunday lectures, but, in 1857, he paid a visit to the Isle of Man and was so pleased with the place that he took up his residence there in a house in the Archway, Douglas. His rooms were crowded with books and he slept in a hammock swung from the roof of the room. Only those who possessed the secret of a peculiar knock were admitted. He lived for years in this way, but, in 1874, was induced to take up his abode in more comfortable quarters. His 'experimental gardens', as he called them, were almost opposite the present Pentonville Prison, and were known as the Frenchman's Island', about which he used to wander in the night-time with a pistol, to frighten off unwelcome visitors.

== Death and legacy ==
He was abstemious in diet, living chiefly on peas, which he carried in his pocket: he said he wished to leave as much as possible for charitable uses. On his death, at Duke Street, Douglas, on 28 October 1875, all his property, including about £10,000, in addition to the value of the estates, was left in trust for philanthropic purposes in the Isle of Man. This disposition was accompanied by some curious provisions.

He was buried on 2 November at St. George's, Douglas. A posthumous bust of him was executed by Emanuel Edward Geflowski.
