= List of museums in London =

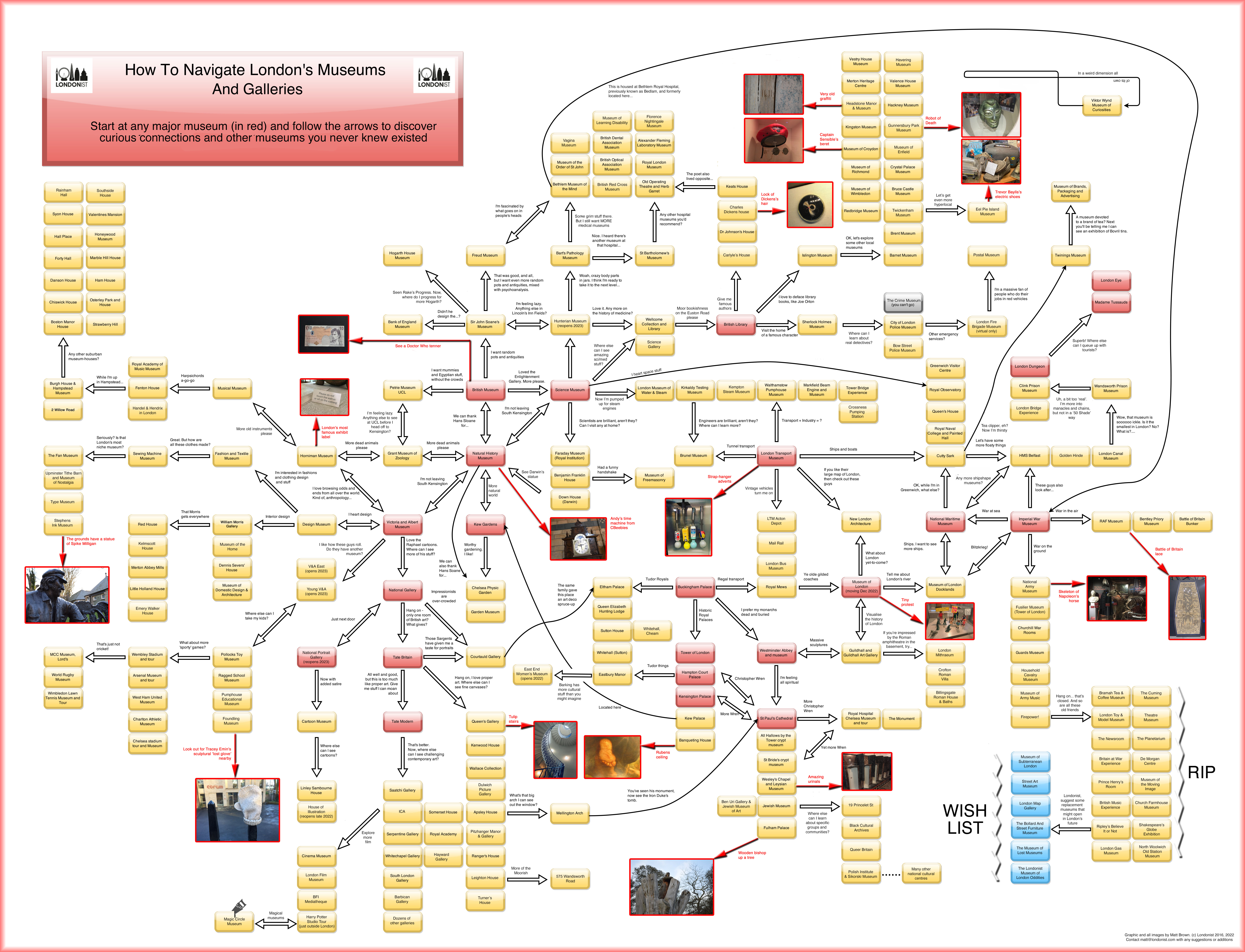
A flow chart of London's museums

This is a list of museums in London, the capital city of England and the United Kingdom. It also includes university and non-profit art galleries. As of 2016, there were over 250 registered art institutions in Greater London.

== List of museums in London ==
Name	Image	District/ward	Borough	Region	Type	Summary
2 Willow Road		Hampstead	Camden	North	Historic house	Operated by the National Trust, modernist terrace house designed by Ernő Goldfinger, features a significant collection of 20th-century art
7 Hammersmith Terrace		Hammersmith	Hammersmith and Fulham	West	Historic house	Former home of Emery Walker, friend and mentor to William Morris, house features Arts and Crafts style interior
18 Stafford Terrace		Holland Park	Kensington and Chelsea	West	Historic house	Also known as Linley Sambourne House, home of the Victorian Punch cartoonist Edward Linley Sambourne, features much of his work
575 Wandsworth Road		Clapham	Lambeth	South	Historic house	Operated by the National Trust, 18th-century terrace house with interiors designed by Kenyan poet and civil servant Khadambi Asalache
All Hallows-by-the-Tower Crypt Museum		Tower	City of London	North East	Religious	Saxon-period Anglican church, museum of church's history, including Roman and Saxon artefacts, historic religious artefacts
Anaesthesia Heritage Centre		Fitzrovia	Westminster	North	Medical	History of anaesthesia and the Association of Anaesthetists of Great Britain and Ireland
Apsley House		Hyde Park Corner	Westminster	North	Historic house	Operated by English Heritage, also known as Wellington Museum, home of the Duke of Wellington, significant collections of paintings, porcelain, sculpture and furniture
Arsenal Football Club Museum		Holloway	Islington	North	Sport	History and memorabilia of the Arsenal F.C.
Art in Perpetuity Trust		Deptford	Lewisham	South East	Art	Contemporary visual art
artsdepot		Finchley	Barnet	North	Art	Arts centre with exhibit gallery
Baden-Powell House Exhibition		South Kensington	Kensington and Chelsea	West	Biographical	History of Lord Baden-Powell, the founder of Scouting
Bank of England Museum		City of London	City of London	North East	Numismatic	History of the Bank and its activities, banknotes and coins, books and documents, pictures, furniture, statues, silver
Bankside Gallery		Bankside	Southwark	South East	Art	Educational charity, home to the Royal Watercolour Society and the Royal Society of Painter Printmakers
Banqueting House, Whitehall		Whitehall	Westminster	North	Historic house	Ornate 17th-century building used for entertaining, designed by Inigo Jones, only remaining component of the Palace of Whitehall
Barbican Centre		Barbican Estate	City of London	North East	Art	Arts centre and gallery
Barnet Museum		Barnet	Barnet	North	Local	Local history, costumes, domestic items, lace
Battle of Britain Bunker		Uxbridge	Hillingdon	West	History	Museum and restored underground operations room at formerly used by No. 11 Group Fighter Command during World War II
Ben Uri Gallery, The London Jewish Museum of Art		St John's Wood	Westminster	North	Art	Jewish art
Benjamin Franklin House			Westminster	North	Historic house	18th-century house where Benjamin Franklin lived for 16 years; exhibits on his life, science activities
Bentley Priory Museum		Stanmore	Harrow	West	History	Museum in former officers' mess at former RAF base at Bentley Priory, used by the RAF Fighter Command and Royal Observer Corps during World War II, focuses on its role as Headquarters Fighter Command during the Battle of Britain
Black Cultural Archives		Brixton	Lambeth	South	Black history	Black history museum and cultural space
Bethlem Museum of the Mind		Beckenham	Bromley	South East	Medical	Art by patients and historic artefacts of Bethlem Royal Hospital
Borough Road Gallery			Southwark	South East	Art	Part of London South Bank University, celebrates the artist David Bomberg and includes the Sarah Rose Collection of his pictures and those of other artists in the Borough Group
Boston Manor House		Boston Manor	Hounslow	West	Historic house	17th-century Jacobean manor house
Bow Street Museum of Crime and Justice		Covent Garden	Westminster	North	Law enforcement	Based in the former Bow Street Police Station, it presents the story of policing in the area from the eighteenth century until 1992, when the police station closed.
Brent Museum		Willesden	Brent	West	Local	Located in the Willesden Green Library Centre, local history and culture; formerly the Grange Museum of Community History
British Airways Heritage Centre		Hatton	Hounslow	West	Aviation	History and memorabilia of British Airways, including uniforms, aircraft models and pictures, posters and photographs
British Dental Association Museum			Westminster	North	Medical	History of dental care in the United Kingdom
British Library		St Pancras	Camden	North	Library	Changing exhibits of art, history and culture from its collections
British Museum		Bloomsbury	Camden	North	Multiple	Art, decorative arts, archaeology, antiquities from Ancient Egypt, Rome, Greece and the Middle East, coins, galleries on Africa, North America, Mexico, Asia
British Optical Association Museum		Charing Cross	Westminster	North	Medical	History of eye care (by appointment only)
British Red Cross Museum and Archives		Moorgate	City of London	North East	Medical	History and memorabilia of the British Red Cross
Brixton Windmill		Brixton	Lambeth	South	Local	Early 19th century windmill; interior open selected days only
Bromley Museum		Orpington	Bromley	South East	Local	Local history and culture
Bruce Castle Museum		Tottenham	Haringey	North	Local	Local history, culture
Brunei Gallery		Bloomsbury	Camden	North	Art	Part of the School of Oriental and African Studies of the University of London, historic and contemporary works from and about Africa and Asia, including photography and culture
Brunel Museum		Rotherhithe	Southwark	South East	Technology	History of the construction of the Thames Tunnel and its designers, Sir Marc Isambard Brunel
Buckingham Palace			Westminster	North	Historic house	Official London residence of the British monarch, public tours of the state rooms, includes Kings Gallery and Royal Mews during summer only
The Building Centre		Bloomsbury	Camden	North	Design	Exhibits on architecture and design
Burgh House & Hampstead Museum		Hampstead	Camden	North	Local	Local history, culture, art exhibits
Camden Arts Centre		Hampstead	Camden	North	Art	Changing exhibits of contemporary art
Camden Arts Project		Hampstead	Camden		Art	Contemporary Arts Gallery in Camden
Campbell Works		Stoke Newington	Hackney	East	Art	Runs a programme of contemporary art exhibitions, public engagement projects, publications and education schemes
Canada House Gallery		Trafalgar Square	Westminster	North	Art	Canadian historical and contemporary art and artefacts
Carlyle's House		Chelsea	Kensington and Chelsea	West	Historic house	Operated by the National Trust, Queen Anne early eighteenth century townhouse, home of Victorian historian and philosopher Thomas Carlyle
Cartoon Museum		Fitzrovia	Camden	North	Art	Political cartoons, comic strips and comic books
Centre for Recent Drawing			Islington	North	Art	Contemporary drawings
Charles Dickens Museum		Holborn	Camden	North	Historic house	Mid–19th-century period house with original papers, furniture and items relating to author Charles Dickens
Chelsea Physic Garden		Chelsea	Kensington and Chelsea	West	Medical	Botanical garden with displays on medicinal uses of plants
Chisenhale Gallery			Tower Hamlets	North East	Art	Non-profit contemporary art gallery
Chiswick House		Chiswick	Hounslow	West	Historic house	18th-century neo-Palladian villa with large collection of art and furniture, gardens
Churchill War Rooms		Whitehall	Westminster	North	Multiple	Includes the World War II-era underground Cabinet War Rooms and the Churchill Museum with exhibits about the life of British statesman Winston Churchill
City of London Police Museum		City of London	City of London	North East	Law enforcement	Uniforms, Victorian-era police equipment, communications devices, famous murders, WWII display
Cinema Museum		Lambeth	Lambeth	South West	Media	History and artefacts of film making
Clarence House		Pall Mall	Westminster	North	Historic house	London residence of His Majesty King Charles III and Queen Camilla (normally open only during August)
Clink Prison Museum		Southwark	Southwark	South East	Prison	Site and history of the notorious prison in use from the 12th century to 1780
The Clockworks		West Norwood	Lambeth	South East	History of technology	Museum of electrical timekeeping, 1840-1970
Courtauld Gallery		Strand	Westminster	North	Art	Part of the University of London, located in Somerset House, features Old Masters and Impressionist paintings
Crime Museum			Westminster	North	Law enforcement	History, artefacts and crime memorabilia of Scotland Yard, not open to the public
Crofton Roman Villa		Orpington	Bromley	South East	Archaeology	Remains of a Roman villa
Crossness Pumping Station		Crossness	Bexley	South East	Technology	Victorian sewage pumping station with preserved steam engines
Crystal Palace Museum		Crystal Palace	Bromley	South East	History	History and memorabilia of The Crystal Palace
Cubitt Gallery		Finsbury	Islington	North	Art	
Cuming Museum		Walworth	Southwark	South East	Local	Local history, culture; small collection of Ancient Egyptian objects. Closed since March 2013 due to fire damage.
Cutty Sark Museum		Greenwich	Greenwich	South East	Maritime	Mid–19th-century clipper, museum ship
Danson House		Danson Park	Bexley	South East	Historic house	18th-century Georgian house
Dennis Severs' House		Spitalfields	Tower Hamlets	North East	History	Enactments of life in the 18th and 19th centuries
Design Museum		Kensington	Kensington and Chelsea	West	Design	Product, industrial, graphic, fashion and architectural design
Dr Johnson's House		City of London	City of London	North East	Historic house	18th-century townhouse home of 18th-century English writer Samuel Johnson
Dorich House		Kingston Vale	Kingston upon Thames	South West	Art	Former studio of the Estonian sculptor Dora Gordine, with a collection of her works and of Russian Imperial art. Part of Kingston University.
Down House		Downe	Bromley	South East	Historic house	Operated by English Heritage, home of naturalist Charles Darwin where he wrote "On the Origin of Species"
Dulwich Picture Gallery		Dulwich	Southwark	South East	Art	Collection of European Old Masters, mostly of the 17th and 18th centuries
Eastbury Manor House		Barking	Barking and Dagenham	North East	Historic house	Owned by the National Trust, 16th-century Tudor gentry house, local history displays
Eltham Palace		Eltham	Greenwich	South East	Historic house	Operated by English Heritage, 1930s Art Deco house with mediaeval Great Hall
Enfield Museum		Enfield	Enfield	North	Local	Local history
Estorick Collection of Modern Italian Art		Canonbury	Islington	North	Art	Modern Italian art
Fan Museum		Greenwich	Greenwich	South East	Fashion	Art and craft of the fan
Faraday Museum		Mayfair	Westminster	North	Science	Located at the Royal Institution, scientist Michael Faraday's 19th century laboratory, activities and people associated with the Institution
Fashion and Textile Museum		Bermondsey	Southwark	South East	Fashion	Fashions, textiles and jewellery, both historic and contemporary
Fenton House		Hampstead	Camden	North	Historic house	Operated by the National Trust, 17th-century merchant's house, features collections of early keyboard instruments, paintings, porcelain, needlework pictures and Georgian furniture
Fleming Museum		Paddington	Westminster	North	Medical	Located at St Mary's Hospital, London, site and history of Alexander Fleming's discovery of penicillin, 1928 period laboratory
Florence Nightingale Museum		Lambeth	Lambeth	South West	Medical	Life and nursing work of Florence Nightingale
Forty Hall Museum		Forty Hill	Enfield	North	Multiple	Local history, 17th- and 18th-century ceramics and pottery, 19th- and 20th-century china, glassware
Foundling Museum		Bloomsbury	Camden	North	Multiple	History of the Foundling Hospital, Britain's first home for abandoned children, art by many of Britain's most prominent 18th-century artists, 18th-century period rooms, room on composer George Frideric Handel and his connection to the hospital
Francis Skaryna Belarusian Library and Museum		North Finchley	Barnet	North	History	Collection of material relating to the history of Belarus
Freud Museum		Hampstead	Camden	North	Historic house	Home of Sigmund Freud, features his study, exhibits on his life and works, collection of Ancient Egyptian artefacts, contemporary art and Freud-themed exhibitions
Fulham Palace		Fulham	Hammersmith and Fulham	West	Historic house	Mediaeval former residence of the Bishop of London, also art gallery
Fusiliers Museum		Tower Hill	Tower Hamlets	North East	Military	History of the Royal Fusiliers, uniforms, regalia, medals, weapons and memorabilia, located at the Tower of London
Galton Collection		Bloomsbury	Camden	North	Medical	Part of the University College London, open by appointment only, scientific instruments, papers, and personal memorabilia of Sir Francis Galton
Garden Museum		Lambeth	Lambeth	South West	Gardening	Tools and artefacts related to ornamental gardening
Garrick's Temple to Shakespeare		Hampton	Richmond upon Thames	South West	Biographical	18th-century folly built by actor David Garrick to celebrate the genius of William Shakespeare, includes display on Garrick's life and acting career
Gasworks Gallery		Kennington	Lambeth	South West	Art	Contemporary art organisation with exhibition space and studios
Goldsmiths' Centre		Clerkenwell	Islington	North	Art	Changing exhibits of contemporary jewellery and silversmithing, operated by the Worshipful Company of Goldsmiths
Golden Hinde		Bankside	Southwark	South East	Maritime	Replica museum ship of the Golden Hind, the 16th-century galleon used by Sir Francis Drake
Gordon Museum of Pathology		Southwark	Southwark	South East	Medical	The largest medical Museum in the United Kingdom, part of King's College London
Grant Museum of Zoology and Comparative Anatomy		Bloomsbury	Camden	North	Natural history	Part of the University College London, skeletons, taxidermy, entomology and specimens preserved in fluid.
Greenwich Visitor Centre		Greenwich	Greenwich	South East	History	Also known as Discover Greenwich Visitor Centre, history of the World Heritage Site, its builders and buildings, maritime heritage, local history
Guards Museum			Westminster	North	Military	History, artefacts and memorabilia of the five regiments of Foot Guards: the Grenadier Guards, Coldstream Guards, Scots Guards, Irish Guards, and Welsh Guards
Guildhall Art Gallery		Bassishaw	City of London	North East	Art	Located in the Guildhall, collection includes art and cultural artefacts about London, Victorian-era works, remains of a Roman amphitheatre in the basement
Gunnersbury Park Museum		Acton	Hounslow	West	Local	Local history of Hounslow and Ealing boroughs, archaeology, costume, fine art, ceramics, also Edwardian era kitchen rooms
Hackney Museum		Hackney	Hackney	North	Local	Local history and culture
Hall Place		Crayford	Bexley	South East	Historic house	16th- and 17th-century former country house; exhibits from the Bexley Museum's collections including art, social history, natural history, geology, archaeology, Ancient Egypt, costumes, furniture
Ham House		Ham	Richmond upon Thames	South West	Historic house	Operated by the National Trust, 17th-century grand house, fine interiors and historic gardens, collections of textiles and furniture
Hampton Court Palace		Hampton	Richmond upon Thames	South West	Historic house	Former royal palace, King Henry VIII exhibition, Tudor kitchen, Tudor-period living history programmes, gardens, maze
Handel Hendrix House		Mayfair	Westminster	North	Historic house	Museum dedicated to the lives and works of the Baroque composer George Frideric Handel and the rock guitarist Jimi Hendrix, who lived in adjoining houses two centuries apart
Harrow Museum		Headstone	Harrow	West	Local	Local history, industry, archaeology, also known as Headstone Manor Museum
Havering Museum		Romford	Havering	North East	Local	
Hayward Gallery		Southbank	Lambeth	South West	Art	Part of the Southbank Centre, contemporary art
Heath Robinson Museum		Pinner	Harrow	North West	Biographical	Life and work of cartoonist Heath Robinson
HMS Belfast		Southwark	Southwark	South East	Maritime	Operated by the Imperial War Museum, originally a Royal Navy light cruiser and served during the Second World War and Korean War
Hogarth's House		Chiswick	Hounslow	West	Historic house	Home of the 18th-century English artist William Hogarth
Museum of Homelessness		Finsbury Park	Haringey	North	History	Social history museum and holder the national collection of homelessness for the UK.
Honeywood Museum		Carshalton	Sutton	South West	Local	17th-century house with details from different eras of ownership, local history exhibits
Honourable Artillery Company Museum		Finsbury	Islington	North	Military	Regimental artefacts and memorabilia (by appointment only)
Horniman Museum and Gardens		Forest Hill	Lewisham	South East	Multiple	Musical instruments, art, natural history, anthropology, African arts and culture, aquarium, gardens
House of Dreams Museum		East Dulwich	Southwark	South East	Art	House turned into outsider art sculpture by former textile designer and art director Steven Wright
House of Illustration		Kings Cross	Camden	North	Art	Located at Granary Square, public gallery dedicated to illustration
Household Cavalry Museum		Horse Guards Parade	Westminster	North	Military	Regimental artefacts and memorabilia of the Household Cavalry
Hunterian Museum		Lincoln's Inn Fields	Westminster	North	Medical	Hunterian Collection of preserved anatomical specimens, history, artefacts and developments in surgery, part of the Royal College of Surgeons
ICANDO		Victoria	Westminster	North	Scouting	Formerly the Girl Guide Heritage Centre; exhibits and activities about Girl Guides
Imperial War Museum London		Southwark	Southwark	South East	Military	Warfare in the 20th and 21st centuries
Inns of Court & City Yeomanry Museum		Lincoln's Inn	Camden	North	Military	Regimental history and artefacts of the Inns of Court & City Yeomanry (by appointment only)
Institute of Archaeology Collections		Bloomsbury	Camden	North	Archaeology	Part of the University College London, open by appointment only, prehistoric ceramics and stone artefacts, Classical Greek and Roman ceramics
Institute of Contemporary Arts		The Mall	Westminster	North	Art	Multi-disciplinary arts centre with exhibit galleries
Islington Museum		Finsbury	Islington	North	Local	Local history
Jack the Ripper Museum			Tower Hamlets	North East	History	History of the East London in the 1880s, providing a serious examination of the crimes of Jack the Ripper within the social context of the period
Jewel Tower		Westminster	Westminster	North	History	Operated by English Heritage, one of only two surviving sections of the mediaeval royal Palace of Westminster, includes an exhibition on the history of Parliament and the building
Jewish Museum London		Camden Town	Camden	North	Ethnic	Jewish culture, heritage and traditions in Britain, ceremonial art collection
Keats House		Hampstead	Camden	North	Historic house	Early 19th-century home of Romantic poet John Keats
Kelmscott House Museum		Hammersmith	Hammersmith and Fulham	West	Art	London home of William Morris; exhibits of his designs
Kennel Club Dog Art Gallery			Westminster	North	Art	Exhibits and collection of dog paintings, open by appointment
Kensington Palace		Kensington Gardens	Kensington and Chelsea	West	Historic house	Royal residence
Kenwood House		Hampstead	Camden	North	Historic house	Operated by English Heritage, 17th-century former country house; interiors by Robert Adam, features collection of Old Master paintings
Kew Gardens		Kew	Richmond upon Thames	South West	Multiple	Includes Shirley Sherwood Gallery of Botanical Art, Marianne North Gallery, exhibits on plants and conservation, Kew Palace
Kew Palace		Kew	Richmond upon Thames	South West	Historic house	Former royal palace located within the Kew Gardens
Kingston Museum		Kingston upon Thames	Kingston upon Thames	South West	Local	Local history, Eadweard Muybridge gallery of photographs, exhibits of art, photography, culture
Kirkaldy Testing Museum		Southwark	Southwark	South East	Technology	Materials testing machines used by engineer David Kirkaldy
L-13 Light Industrial Workshop		Clerkenwell	Islington	North	Art	Contemporary art space
Lambeth Palace		Lambeth	Lambeth	South West	Historic house	Tours of the official London residence of the Archbishop of Canterbury on selected days only
Landmark Arts Centre		Teddington	Richmond upon Thames	West	Art	Arts centre with visual art gallery, located in the former St Alban's Church
Langdon Down Museum of Learning Disability		Teddington	Richmond upon Thames	South West	Medical	Operated by the Down's Syndrome Association in the Langdon Down Centre, history of treating people with learning disabilities
Lethaby Gallery		Kings Cross	Camden	North	Art	Located at Granary Square, art gallery of Central Saint Martins, features contemporary and historic works from its collections of art and design
Leighton House Museum		Holland Park	Kensington and Chelsea	West	Art	Victorian house of painter Frederic, Lord Leighton, features paintings, sculpture, Middle Eastern tiles
Library and Museum of Freemasonry		Holborn	Camden	North	Masonic	Library, artefacts and regalia of Freemasonry
Little Holland House		Carshalton	Sutton	South West	Historic house	Arts and Crafts home of the artist Frank Dickinson (1874–1961) with interior influenced by John Ruskin and William Morris
London Canal Museum		Kings Cross	Islington	North	Transport	History of London's canals
London Film Museum		Covent Garden	Westminster	North	Media	Props, costumes, sets and artefacts from British films, history of moviemaking
London Fire Brigade Museum		Southwark	Southwark	South East	Firefighting	Open by appointment only, history of the London Fire Brigade, equipment, apparatus
London Mithraeum		City of London	City of London	Central	Archaeology	Remains of a Roman temple to Mithras
London Motorcycle Museum		Greenford	Ealing	West	Transport	Over 150 classic and British motorcycles
London Museum of Water & Steam		Brentford	Hounslow	West	Technology	Water supply technology and a collection of water pumping steam engines, also operating narrow gauge railway; formerly the Kew Bridge Steam Museum
London Sewing Machine Museum		Wimbledon	Merton	South West	Technology	Collection of sewing machines
London Transport Museum		Covent Garden	Westminster	North	Transport	Public transport including the railway, underground, buses, memorabilia
London Transport Museum Depot		Acton	Ealing	West	Transport	Houses the majority of the museum's collection, open day visits and tours
Madame Tussauds London			Westminster	North	Wax	Wax figures of celebrities in acting, music, politics, sport, history, royalty and fiction
Mall Galleries		Trafalgar Square	Westminster	North	Art	Gallery exhibits of the Federation of British Artists
Magic Circle Museum			Camden	North	Magic	Magic tricks, props, posters, artefacts, open by appointment
Mansion House		City of London	City of London	North East	Historic house	Guided tours of the public rooms of the official residence of the Lord Mayor of the City of London, includes city regalia, 17th-century Dutch and Flemish paintings, gold and silver plate collections; open on selected days only
Marble Hill House		Richmond	Richmond upon Thames	South West	Historic house	Operated by English Heritage, 18th-century Palladian villa with Georgian interior
Markfield Beam Engine and Museum		Tottenham	Haringey	North	Technology	Victorian 100 horsepower beam pumping engine
MCC Museum		St John's Wood	Westminster	North	Sport	History and memorabilia of cricketing, located at Lord's Cricket Ground
Media Space		South Kensington	Kensington and Chelsea	West	Art	Located on the second floor of the Science Museum, showcases the collection of the National Media Museum, explores relationships between, and lesser-known histories of, photography, science, art and technology
Merton Heritage Centre		Morden	Merton	South West	Local	Local history
MOCA, London		Peckham Rye	Southwark	South East	Art	Museum dedicated to Contemporary Art of varied media. Curated by Michael Petry
Moco Museum		Hyde Park	Westminster	North	Art	Museum of modern and contemporary art, opened August 2024
Morley Gallery		South Bank	Lambeth	South West	Art	Part of Morley College, exhibitions include painting, printmaking, sculpture, photography, ceramics, textiles, installations, digital and sound art
Museum of Army Music		Twickenham	Richmond upon Thames	South West	Music	Open Wednesday afternoons and by appointment, history of British military bands and music, includes musical instruments, banners, uniforms, paintings, model bands. Now closed and the site is a school.
Museum of Asian Music		Acton	Ealing	West	Music	Musical instruments, music extracts and video clips of music from across Asia
Museum of Brands		Notting Hill	Kensington and Chelsea	West	Media	Advertising, packaging and brand memorabilia and artefacts, including domestic products, packaging, posters, toys and games
Museum of Comedy		Bloomsbury	Camden	North	Media	Located in the undercroft of St. George's, Bloomsbury, photos, posters, memorabilia, scripts, video and film about the history of British comedy
Museum of Croydon		Croydon	Croydon	South West	Local	Local history, culture, social history, Riesco Gallery with collections of Chinese pottery and ceramics, and Roman and Anglo-Saxon collections
Museum of Domestic Design and Architecture		Colindale	Barnet	North	Art	Open by appointment only, research museum of Middlesex University, 19th- and 20th-century decorative arts for the home including textiles and wallpaper
Museum of Immigration and Diversity		Spitalfields	Tower Hamlets	North East	History	Open selected days only
Museum of Life Sciences		Southwark	Southwark	South East	Natural history	Historic biological and pharmaceutical collections, including skeletons, fluid-preserved material, taxidermy, and fossils; part of King's College London
Museum of London		Barbican Estate	City of London	North East	History	City's history, culture, archaeology
Museum of London Docklands		Isle of Dogs	Tower Hamlets	North East	Maritime	Maritime, river and local history
Museum of Richmond		Richmond	Richmond upon Thames	South West	Local	Local history, culture
Museum of the Home		Shoreditch	Hackney	North	Art and historic house	Changing style of the English domestic interior in a series of period rooms from 1600 to the present day. Also historic alms house. Formerly the Geffrye Museum.
Museum of the Order of St John		Clerkenwell	Islington	North	Medical	History of the Order of St John and its medical care in the community
Museum of Wimbledon		Wimbledon	Merton	South West	Local	Local history, culture
Musical Museum		Brentford	Hounslow	West	Music	Collection of music boxes and automatic instruments
National Army Museum		Chelsea	Kensington and Chelsea	West	Military	History and artefacts of the British Army
National Gallery		Trafalgar Square	Westminster	North	Art	National collection of Western European painting from the 13th century to 1900
National Maritime Museum		Greenwich	Greenwich	South East	Maritime	History of Britain at sea, includes maritime art, ship models and plans, scientific and navigational instruments, instruments for time-keeping and astronomy. Incorporates Greenwich Observatory and the Queen's House.
National Portrait Gallery		Soho	Westminster	North	Art	Portraits of historically important and famous British people
Natural History Museum		South Kensington	Kensington and Chelsea	West	Natural history	Also includes the Geological Museum, collections focus is botany, entomology, mineralogy, palaeontology and zoology.
Old Operating Theatre Museum and Herb Garret		Southwark	Southwark	South East	Medical	19th-century operating theatre, herb garret and museum of surgery
Old Royal Naval College		Greenwich	Greenwich	South East	History	
Old Speech Room Gallery and Museum, Harrow School		Harrow	Harrow	West	Art	Egyptian and Greek antiquities, English watercolours, Modern British paintings, sculpture, printed books and natural history
Orleans House Gallery		Twickenham	Richmond upon Thames	South West	Art	Municipal art gallery, also the Stables Gallery
Osterley Park and House		Isleworth	Hounslow	West	Historic house	Operated by the National Trust, late 18th-century palace designed by Robert Adam, ornate interiors, gardens
Parasol unit foundation for contemporary art			Hackney	North	Art	Exhibitions of works by international contemporary artists working in various media
Peckham Platform			Southwark	South East	Art	Contemporary art
Petrie Museum of Egyptian Archaeology		Bloomsbury	Camden	North	Archaeology	Artifacts from Ancient Egypt, part of the University College London
The Photographers' Gallery		Soho	Westminster	North	Art	Photography
Pitzhanger Manor		Ealing	Ealing	West	Historic house	Designed by the architect John Soane, has exhibitions of contemporary art.
Polish Institute and Sikorski Museum		South Kensington	Westminster	West	Military	Contributions of the Polish Armed Forces in the West in World War II
Pollock's Toy Museum		Fitzrovia	Camden	North	Toy	Toys, games, dolls, puppets, folk toys
Postal Museum		Clerkenwell	Islington	North	Philatelic	Postal communications history, stamps, letters, artefacts
Pushkin House		Bloomsbury	Camden	North	Art	Russian art and culture
Queen Charlotte's Cottage		Kew	Richmond upon Thames	South West	Historic house	Located within the Kew Gardens, 18th-century rustic retreat built for Queen Charlotte, open seasonally
Queen Elizabeth's Hunting Lodge		Chingford	Waltham Forest	North East	Historic house	Tudor hunting lodge
King's Gallery			Westminster	North	Art	Exhibitions of items from the Royal Collection, located at Buckingham Palace
Queen's House		Greenwich	Greenwich	South East	Art	Marine art gallery of the National Maritime Museum
Queer Britain		Kings Cross, London	Camden	North	Art and history	Britain's first dedicated LGBTQ museum
Ragged School Museum			Tower Hamlets	North East	Education	History of the Victorian-era charity schools
Rainham Hall		Rainham	Havering	North East	Historic house	Operated by the National Trust, 18th-century Queen Anne house
Ranger's House (Wernher Collection)		Greenwich	Greenwich	South East	Art	Operated by English Heritage, Georgian villa with fine and decorative art collection, including silver and jewels, paintings and porcelain
Red House		Bexleyheath	Bexley	South East	Historic house	Operated by the National Trust, 19th-century house commissioned, created and lived in by William Morris, founder of the Arts and Crafts Movement
Red Mansion Foundation		Portland Place	Westminster	North	Art	Gallery exhibits of contemporary Chinese art
Redbridge Museum		Ilford	Redbridge	North East	Local	Local history, culture, located on the second floor of Ilford Central Library
RCM Museum of Music		South Kensington	Kensington and Chelsea	West	Music	Musical instruments, art, documents and accessories, part of the Royal College of Music
Riverside Gallery		Richmond	Richmond upon Thames	South West	Art	Municipal art gallery
Rivington Place		Shoreditch	Hackney	North	Art	International visual arts centre, home to InIVA and Autograph ABP
Rose Theatre Exhibition		Bankside	Southwark	South East	Archaeology	Excavations of an Elizabethan theatre
Royal Academy of Arts		Piccadilly	Westminster	North	Art	Located in Burlington House
Royal Academy of Music Museum		Regent's Park	Westminster	North	Music	Musical instruments and artefacts of the Royal Academy of Music
Royal Air Force Museum London		Colindale	Barnet	North	Aviation	History of aviation and the British Royal Air Force
Royal Armouries, Tower of London		Tower Hill	Tower Hamlets	North East	Military	Arms and armour dating from the Middle Ages onwards
Royal College of Nursing Library and Museum		Cavendish Square	Westminster	Central	Medical	History and future of nursing
Royal College of Physicians Museum		Regent's Park	Camden	North	Medical	Portraits, silver, medical instruments and artefacts
Royal Hospital Chelsea Museum		Chelsea	Kensington and Chelsea	West	Military	Military artefacts and memorabilia, items related to the Duke of Wellington
Royal London Hospital Archives and Museum		Whitechapel	Tower Hamlets	North	Medical	History of the hospital and medical care in the East End
Royal Mews			Westminster	North	Transport	The King's stables, features State vehicles including horse-drawn carriages and motor cars, and the Gold State Coach
Royal Observatory, Greenwich		Greenwich	Greenwich	South East	Horology	Part of the National Maritime Museum, features astronomical and navigational tools, a planetarium
Royal Pharmaceutical Society Museum		Lambeth	Lambeth	South West	Medical	British pharmacy history, medicines and artefacts
Saatchi Gallery		Chelsea	Kensington and Chelsea	West	Art	Contemporary art
St Bartholomew's Hospital Museum		Smithfield	City of London	North East	Medical	History of the hospital and its work, historic surgical instruments, sculpture, mediaeval archives, works of art including paintings by William Hogarth
St Paul's Cathedral		Ludgate Hill	City of London	North East	Religious	Anglican cathedral with religious art, sculpture, architecture, tombs, decorative arts
Salvation Army International Heritage Centre		Denmark Hill	Southwark	South	Religious	Within William Booth College; museum and archive charting the history of the Christian church and charity, The Salvation Army
Science Gallery London		Southwark	Southwark	South East	Science and art	Exhibitions of art illuminating scientific topics
Science Museum		South Kensington	Kensington and Chelsea	West	Science	National museum of science and technology, transport, medicine, steam engines
Serpentine Galleries		Kensington Gardens	Westminster	West	Art	Serpentine Gallery and Serpentine Sackler Gallery in Kensington Gardens, exhibitions of contemporary art, architecture and design
Sherlock Holmes Museum		Regent's Park	Westminster	North	Biographical	Dedicated to the fictional detective Sherlock Holmes
Shirley Windmill		Shirley	Croydon	South West	Mill	Restored mid–19th-century tower windmill
The Showroom			Westminster	North	Art	Contemporary art gallery
Sir John Soane's Museum		Holborn	Camden	North	Art	Fine art, architecture, antiquities, sculpture
Somerset House		Strand	Westminster	North	Art	Arts centre with gallery and Courtauld Gallery
Soseki Museum in London		Clapham	Lambeth	South West	Historic house	London home of Japanese author Natsume Sōseki
South London Gallery		Camberwell	Southwark	South East	Art	Contemporary art
Southside House		Wimbledon	Merton	South West	Historic house	17th-century period house
Spencer House		St James's	Westminster	North	Historic house	18th-century mansion with restored state rooms and garden
Stephens Collection		Finchley	Barnet	North	Biographical	Life of Dr Henry Stephens, inventor of an indelible blue-black ink, and his son Henry Charles Stephens, their ink company and local history
Strawberry Hill		Twickenham	Richmond upon Thames	South West	Historic house	Gothic villa home of Horace Walpole
Studio Voltaire		Clapham	Lambeth	South	Art	Contemporary art
Sutton House		Hackney	Hackney	North	Historic house	Operated by the National Trust, 16th-century Tudor house
Syon House		Brentford	Hounslow	West	Historic house	Family residence of the Duke of Northumberland, 18th-century house with interior by Robert Adam, collections of paintings and furniture, gardens, park
Tate Britain		Millbank	Westminster	North	Art	National collection of historical and contemporary British art
Tate Modern		Bankside	Southwark	South East	Art	National collection of modern and contemporary art
Tower Bridge			Tower Hamlets	North East	Technology	Steam engines, workings of the bridge
Tower of London		Tower Hill	Tower Hamlets	North East	Multiple	Historic fortress, prison and former royal residence, includes the Royal Armouries, Crown Jewels of the United Kingdom, regimental museum of the Royal Fusiliers
Twinings Museum		Strand	Westminster	North	Food	History of Twinings, tea caddies and tea history
Twist Museum		Oxford Street	Westminster	North	Science	Interactive museum focussing on optical illusions and visual perception
Twickenham Museum		Twickenham	Richmond upon Thames	South West	Local	Local history
Two Temple Place			Westminster	North	Art	Late Victorian mansion, now an art gallery to showcase publicly owned art from UK regional collections, only open during exhibitions
UCL Geology Collections		Bloomsbury	Camden	North	Natural history	Part of the University College London, rocks, minerals, fossils on display in the Rock Room, limited opening hours
Upminster Tithe Barn Museum of Nostalgia		Upminster	Havering	North East	History	Artefacts of rural domestic and agricultural life
Upminster Windmill		Upminster	Havering	North East	Mill	19th-century windmill; exhibits on its history
Vagina Museum		Camden	Camden	North	Museum	Aims to celebrate female reproductive anatomy and challenge myths and misconceptions
Valence House Museum		Dagenham	Barking and Dagenham	North East	Local	Local history, archaeology, maritime and fishing industry, art
Valentines Mansion		Ilford	Redbridge	North East	Historic house	Country house with recreated Victorian kitchen and Georgian rooms, contemporary art exhibits, 18th-century gardens
Vestry House Museum		Walthamstow	Waltham Forest	North East	Local	Local history, culture
Victoria and Albert Museum		South Kensington	Kensington and Chelsea	West	Multiple	National collection of applied arts, includes ceramics, glass, textiles, costumes, silver, ironwork, jewellery, furniture, mediaeval objects, sculpture, prints and printmaking, drawings and photographs, theatre and performing arts, Asian art and decorative arts, architecture
The Viktor Wynd Museum of Curiosities, Fine Art & Natural History		Hackney	Hackney	North	Multiple	Includes natural and scientific curiosities, art, pop culture objects
Wallace Collection		Marylebone	Westminster	North	Art	Old masters and decorative arts
Walthamstow Pumphouse Museum		Walthamstow	Waltham Forest	North East	Transport	The museum is due to become the Lea Valley Experience, pioneering achievements in road, rail, air and sea transport in the River Lea valley from the early 19th century.
Wandle Industrial Museum		Mitcham	Merton	South West	Industry	Industries along the River Wandle, including flour and textile mills
Wandsworth Museum		Wandsworth	Wandsworth	South West	Local	Local history
Wellcome Collection			Camden	North	Medical	Medical artefacts and original artworks exploring "ideas about the connections between medicine, life and art"; exhibits from the collections of the Wellcome Library
Wellington Arch		Hyde Park Corner	Westminster	North	History	Triumphal arch with exhibits about its history
Wesley's Chapel, Museum of Methodism and John Wesley's House			Islington	North	Religious	History of Methodism from its founding by John Wesley to the present
Westminster Abbey Museum		Westminster	Westminster	North	Religious	Royal and other funeral effigies, religious artefacts
Westminster Dragoons Museum		Fulham	Hammersmith and Fulham	West	Military	Regimental artefacts, regalia and memorabilia, collection currently in storage
White Lodge Museum and Ballet Resource Centre		Richmond	Richmond upon Thames	South West	Ballet	History of the Royal Ballet School, daily life of its students, history and development of Classical ballet, history of White Lodge, visits by appointment
Whitechapel Gallery		Whitechapel	Tower Hamlets	North East	Art	Contemporary art
Whitehall		Cheam	Sutton	South West	Historic house	Tudor house with elements from different eras
Whitewebbs Museum of Transport		Crews Hill	Enfield	North	Transport	Cars, trucks, motorcycles, model railway
Wiener Library		Bloomsbury	Camden	North	History	Exhibits of art and history from its collections about the Holocaust and genocides around the world
William Morris Gallery		Walthamstow	Waltham Forest	North East	Art	Arts and Crafts movement furniture, textiles, ceramics and glass
Wimbledon Lawn Tennis Museum		Wimbledon	Merton	South West	Sport	History of tennis
Wimbledon Windmill Museum		Wimbledon	Merton	South West	Mill	19th-century windmill' exhibits on its history and on other windmills
World Rugby Museum		Twickenham	Richmond upon Thames	South West	Sport	Rugby union history and the England national rugby union team, players, memorabilia, history of Twickenham Stadium
Young V&A		Bethnal Green	Tower Hamlets	North East	Toy	Toys, dolls, children's playtime and lives

== Defunct museums ==
- 491 Gallery, closed in 2013
- Bethnal Green Museum (now known as the Young V&A)
- Bramah Tea and Coffee Museum
- British Music Experience, closed in 2014 and relocated to Liverpool, opened in 2017
- BT Museum
- Church Farmhouse Museum
- Clockmakers' Museum (collections were moved to the Science Museum in 2015)
- Clowns Gallery-Museum closed in 2018 and seeking new venue
- Dalí Universe
- De Morgan Centre, closed Wandsworth location in 2014 and seeking new venue
- Egyptian Hall
- Erith Museum
- Firepower: The Royal Artillery Museum, closed in 2016, collections in storage for proposed Salisbury Plain Heritage Centre
- Fleming Collection
- Geological Museum (now part of the Natural History Museum)
- Gilbert Collection (collections now at the Victoria and Albert Museum)
- Greenwich Heritage Centre, Woolwich
- Heralds' Museum
- Heritage Motor Museum, Syon Park (collections now at the Heritage Motor Centre in Warwickshire)
- Hermitage Rooms
- Holophusikon
- Island History Trust
- Jewish Military Museum (collection moved to the Jewish Museum London)
- Jewish Museum (Finchley)
- King George III Museum (some collections now at the Science Museum)
- Livesey Museum for Children
- London Gas Museum
- London General Cab Company Museum, Brixton
- London Toy and Model Museum, closed in 1999
- London Motor Museum
- London Museum (collections now at the Museum of London)
- Musaeum Tradescantianum
- Museum of British Transport, Clapham (collections now at the National Railway Museum (York) and the London Transport Museum)
- Museum of Mankind (collections now returned to the British Museum)
- Museum of the Moving Image (London)
- Nature Study Museum, 1904–1942 in the old mortuary of St George in the East church
- The Newsroom - Guardian and Observer Archive and Visitor Centre
- North Woolwich Old Station Museum
- Passmore Edwards Museum
- Percival David Foundation of Chinese Art (collections now at the British Museum)
- Prince Henry's Room
- Pumphouse Educational Museum, closed in 2011
- Royal Artillery Museum, closed in 2001 and collections moved to now-defunct Firepower: The Royal Artillery Museum; collections in storage for proposed Salisbury Plain Heritage Centre
- Rotunda (Woolwich)
- Southall Railway Centre, no longer open to the public
- Shakespeare’s Globe Exhibition No longer open to the public; closed in early 2019. Used to contain displays relating to the history of the theatre, costumes, music, theatrical effects, dioramas, and a recreation of a 17th-century printing press
- Theatre Museum (collections now at the Victoria and Albert Museum)
- Type Archive
- West Ham United Museum
- Winston Churchill's Britain At War Experience
- Women's Library, no longer hosts exhibits
- Woodlands Art Gallery

== Visitor figures ==
The Department for Digital, Culture, Media and Sport (DCMS) publishes monthly visitor figures for the public sector museums and galleries which it sponsors, which include most of the leading museums in London.

The most popular London museum in the private sector is The Sherlock Holmes Museum.

The DCMS totals for the financial year to 31 March 2008 were as follows:

- Tate Modern and Tate Britain – (see note) 6,769,949
- British Museum – 6,037,930
- National Gallery – 3,914,000
- Natural History Museum – 3,613,953
- Science Museum – 2,711,680
- Victoria and Albert Museum – 2,280,759
- National Maritime Museum – 1,765,814
- National Portrait Gallery – 1,645,680
- Imperial War Museum – 759,571
- Horniman Museum – 477,894
- Wallace Collection – 335,349
- V&A Museum of Childhood – 332,844
- Museum of London – 316,992
- Churchill Museum and Cabinet War Rooms – 306,600
- HMS Belfast – 258,941
- Museum of London Docklands – 100,834
- Sir John Soane's Museum – 93,427
- Geffrye Museum – 80,352
- Theatre Museum – 6,852 (closed permanently in August 2007)

NOTE: Tate Modern and Tate Britain are on separate sites two miles apart, but the DCMS only publishes a single combined visitor figure for them. Tate Modern is widely reported to attract the more visitors of the two, but it is not clear whether it received more visitors than the British Museum on its own.

The majority of government-funded museums stopped charging admission fees in 2001 and, although this was challenged in 2007, this has remained the case. Following the removal of admission charges, attendances at London museums increased, with a large percentage of the 42 million annual visitors nationwide.

== See also ==
- Albertopolis
- Museum Mile, London
- The London Museums of Health & Medicine
- Culture of London
- Category:Tourist attractions in London
