= House of Dreams =

House of Dreams may refer to:

- House of Dreams (album), a 2009 album by Sunstorm
- "House of Dreams" (song), a 2013 single by Bliss n Eso
- House of Dreams (film), a 1963 American horror film
- House of Dreams (museum), a house in East Dulwich, England, the personal art museum of textile designer and art director Stephen Wright
- House of Dreams (TV series), a 2004 A&E reality show, hosted by George Wendt
