= King's Gallery =

Public art gallery of Buckingham Palace

Coordinates: 51°29′59.287″N 0°8′32.67″W

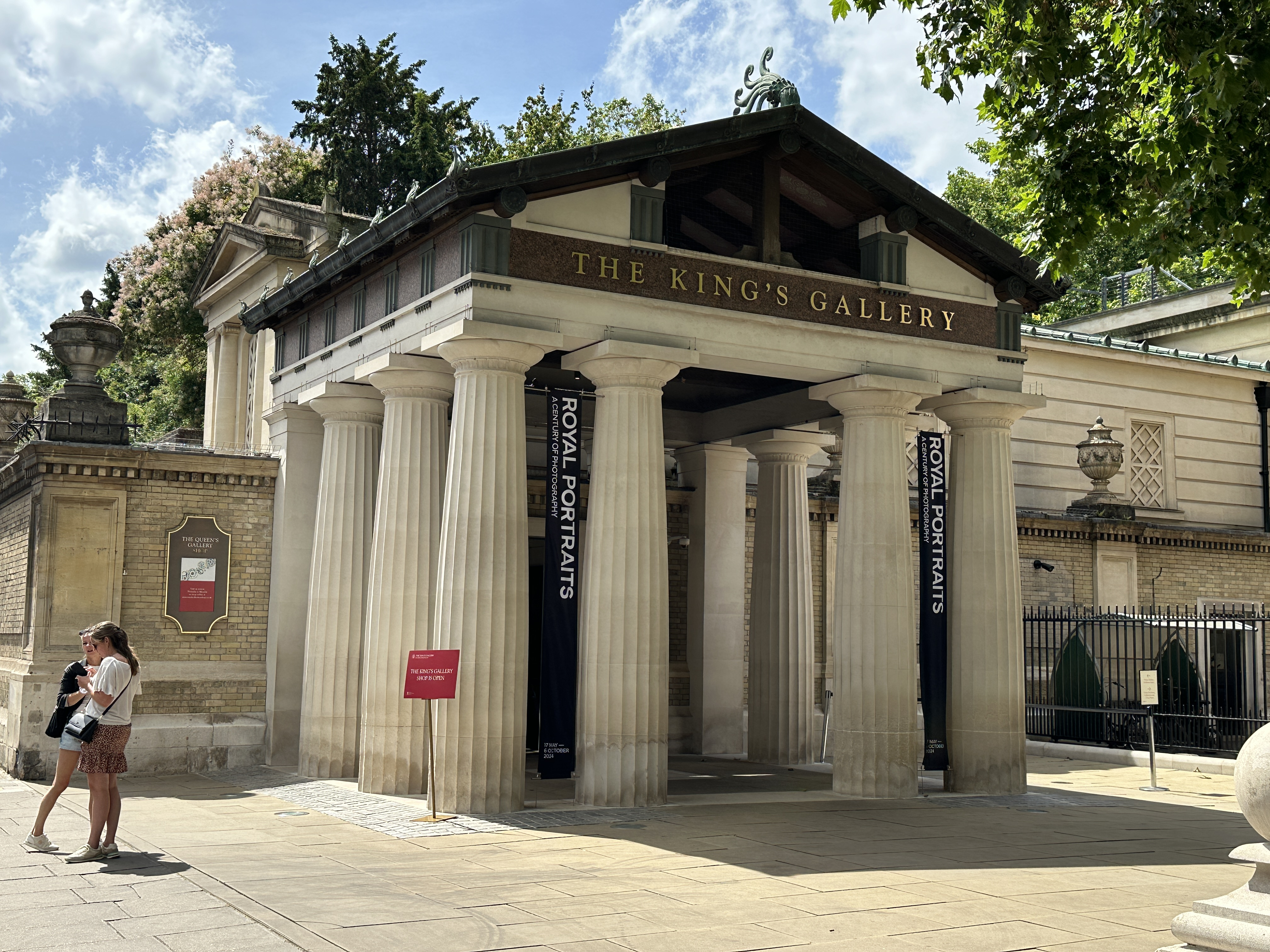

- Location within Central London
- Established: 1962; 64 years ago
- Location: Buckingham Palace; London, SW1; United Kingdom
- Public transit access: Victoria
- Website: Official website

The King's Gallery, previously known as the Queen's Gallery, is a public art gallery at Buckingham Palace, the official residence of the British monarch, in London. First opened to the public in the reign of Elizabeth II in 1962, it exhibits works of art from the Royal Collection on a rotating basis. Enlarged in the early 21st century, the gallery has its own separate public access entrance built in a "new" classical style and typically displays about 450 works, mainly paintings and drawings.

== Building history ==
The gallery forms the most protruding south wing of the Palace. It is on the site of the palace chapel bombed during the Second World War. The purpose-built gallery opened in 1962; in the next 37 years it received five million visitors, until its closure in 1999 for refurbishment and expansion. The work was commissioned from architect John Simpson. On 21 May 2002, the gallery was reopened by Elizabeth II to coincide with her Golden Jubilee. The new work included a Doric entrance portico and new rooms, more than tripling the space available. It is open to the public for most of the year.

== Exhibitions ==
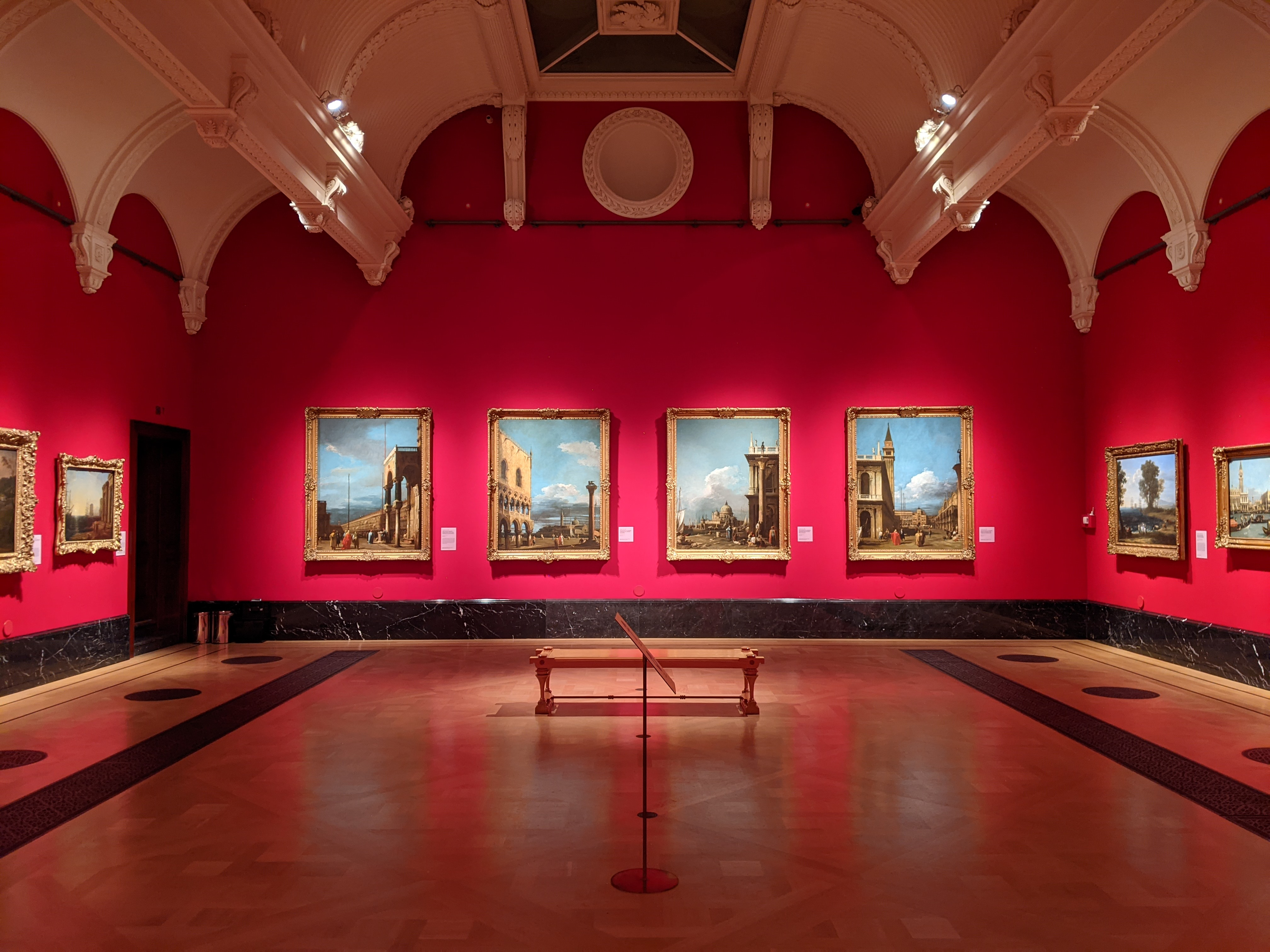
An exhibition at the King's Gallery

- From May to October 2019, the Gallery housed an exhibition of 200 of Leonardo da Vinci's drawings from the Royal Collection
- From November 2024 to March 2025, the King’s Gallery hosted Drawing the Italian Renaissance.
- From 11th April 2025 to 23rd November 2025, the King’s Gallery hosted The Edwardians: The Age of Elegance.
- From 10th April 2026 to 18th April 2027, the King’s Gallery is hosting Queen Elizabeth II: Her Life in Style. It displayed over 300 items of dresses, handbags and shoes of Queen Elizabeth II to mark what would have been her centenary year.Originally meant to run until the 18th October 2026, it was extended by six months due to unprecedented demand.

== See also ==
- List of museums in London
- Royal Collection

== Sources ==
- Fisher, Mark (2004). Britain's Best Museums and Galleries. London: Penguin
