= Wandsworth Museum =

Coordinates: 51.4571°N 0.2005°W

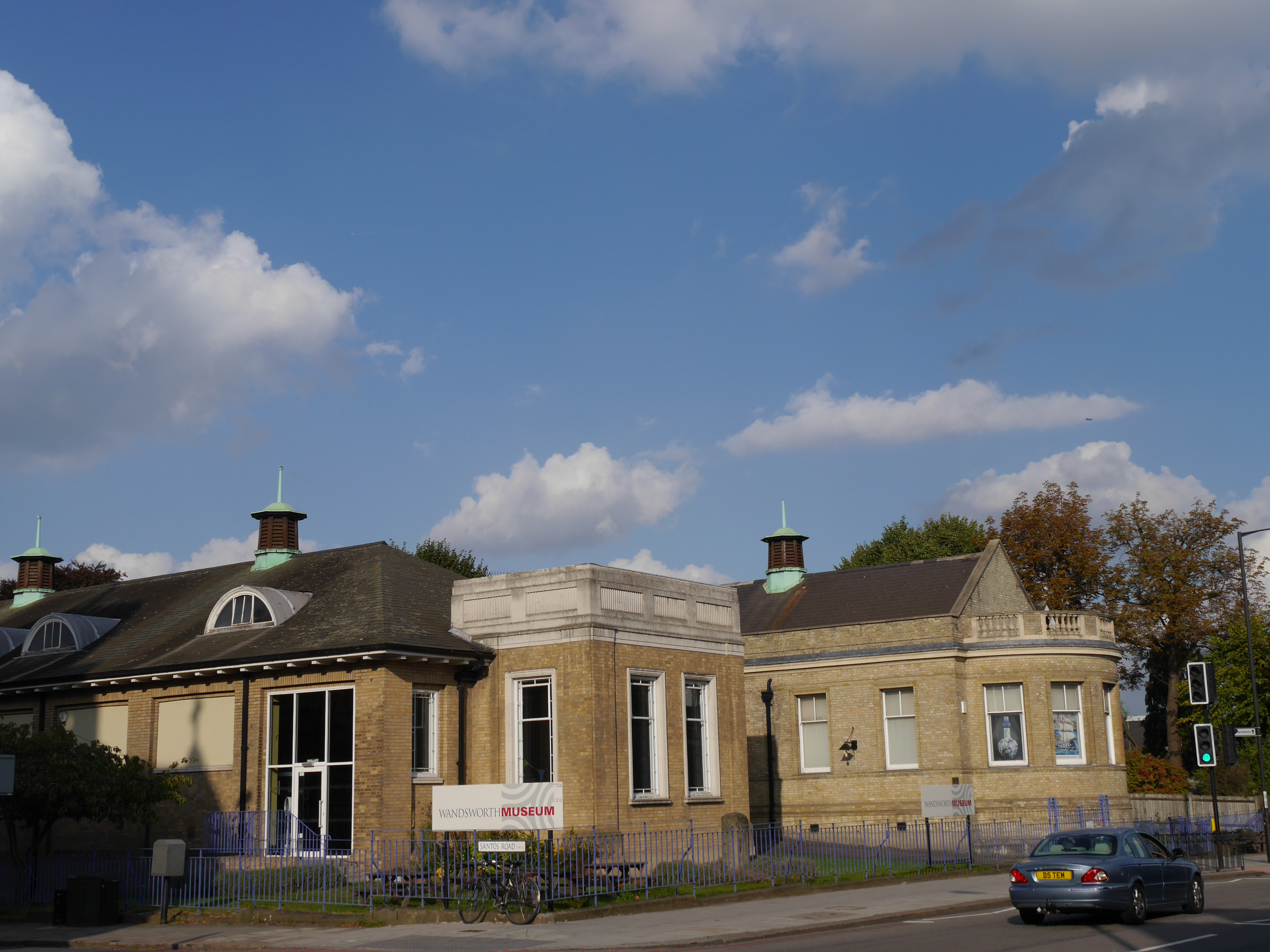
Wandsworth Museum, 2014

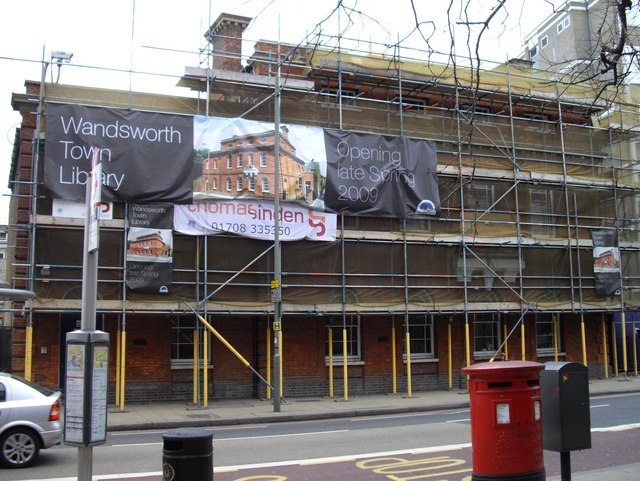
The museum during redevelopment in 2009

Wandsworth Museum was a local museum in the London Borough of Wandsworth, southwest London, England. This community museum covered the cultural and social history of Wandsworth, especially artefacts and artworks that show contemporary and traditional skills of local people.

== History ==
In 2007 Wandsworth Museum was suspended, attracting objectors and renewed interest in its collections including objections from the UK Museums Association.

The museum reopened in September 2010 after a three-year closure having gathered promises of £2 million of funding by local philanthropists.

It closed again in 2016, and Wandsworth Council and the Battersea Arts Collection became custodians of the collection. It was registered as a charity in 2008 until removal in 2017. The Wandsworth Museum was folded into the Battersea Arts Collection to form the BAC Moving Museum.

Battersea Arts Centre gave the collection back to Wandsworth Council in 2021 saying "Along with many arts organisations, we lost 50% of our annual income due to the pandemic, and this period has had a significant impact on our available resources, including our ability to successfully fundraise for the Wandsworth Borough Collection."

== Building and exhibits ==
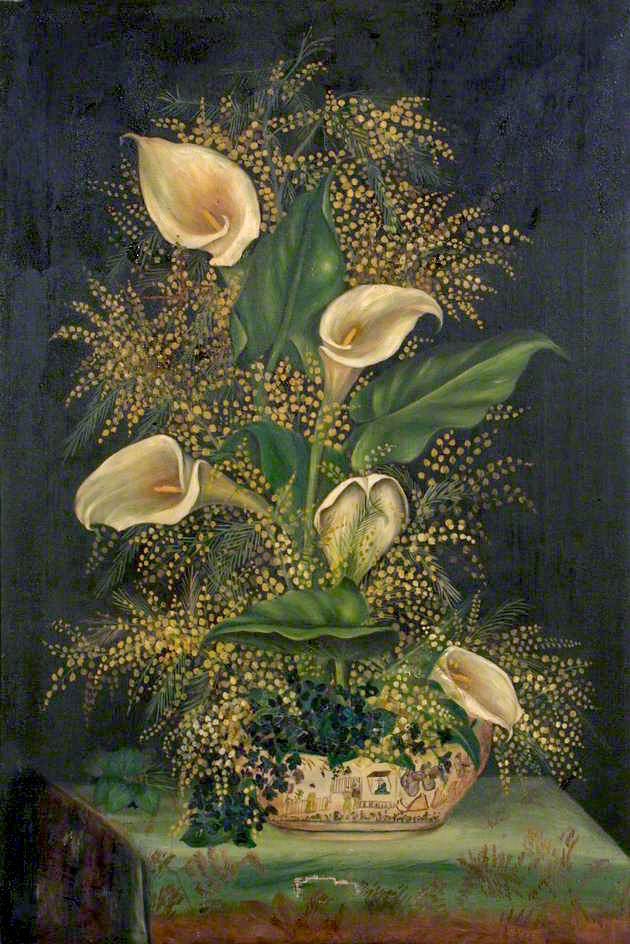
Elizabeth Clasper. "Vase of Lilies"

Wandsworth Museum was based at the low-rise but tall-storied Victorian stone-embellished public building — the former West Hill Reference Library — 38 West Hill, Wandsworth between 2010 and 2016. The museum was a function of the local authority.

The museum displayed the history of Wandsworth and in part of the rest of the borough through the ages, with artefacts exhibited including an ornate Iron Age shield recovered from the Thames and further collections in its catalogue available for inspection. Prior to 2014 it featured the De Morgan Centre, with exhibits of the ceramics of William De Morgan and of the paintings of Evelyn De Morgan.

== See also ==
- List of museums in London
