= Queer Britain =

Coordinates: 51.5357°N 0.1239°W

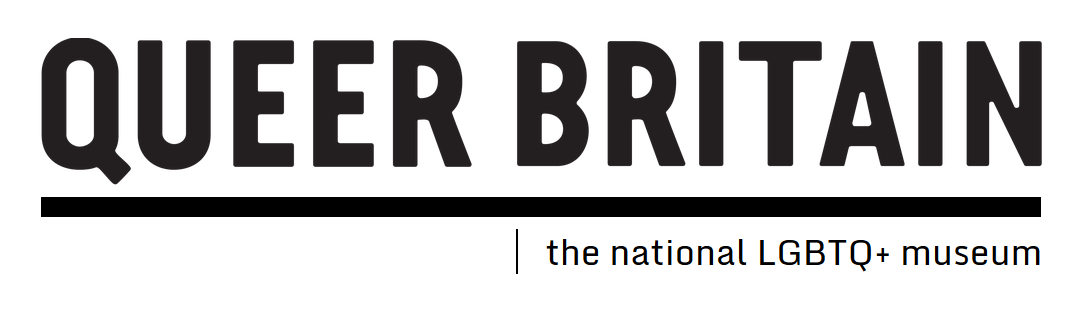

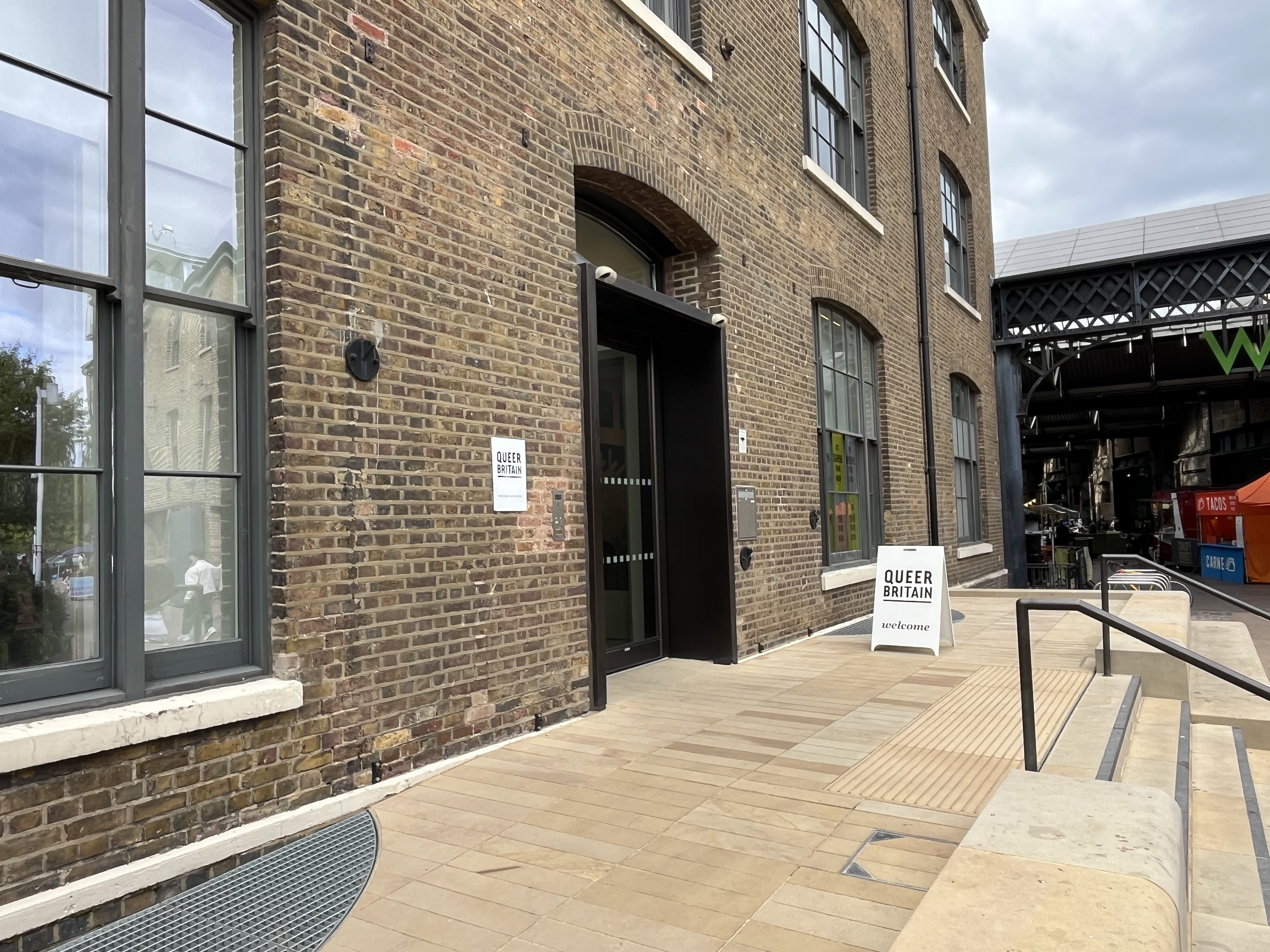
- Established: May 2022
- Location: 2 Granary Square, Kings Cross, London
- Type: Museum
- Director: Andrew Given
- Curator: Jennifer Shearman
- Website: queerbritain.org.uk

Queer Britain is a museum of British LGBTQ history and culture located in Kings Cross, London. It is the first dedicated LGBTQ museum in the UK. The museum consists of three connected galleries plus a shop and occupies the ground floor of 2 Granary Square, a building owned by the Art Fund, with office and studio space on lower ground. Admission is free.

== History ==
Queer Britain was founded in February 2018 by Joseph Galliano-Doig, a former editor of Gay Times, and Ian Mehrtens. It was registered as a charity in September 2019. Joseph was awarded an MBE for services to Heritage, to Charity, and to Diversity and Inclusion in the 2024 New Year's Honours List.

== Exhibitions ==
Prior to gaining its own location, Queer Britain staged occasional exhibitions in temporary locations. In 2018 it staged an exhibition Our Naked Skin in collaboration with the Salisbury Arts Centre including a filmed oral history project, Virtually Queer. In summer 2019 it staged an exhibition on Chosen Family in Mercer Street Showrooms, Covent Garden.

Queer Britain opened as a physical museum on May 5, 2022, in advance of the 50th anniversary of Britain's first gay pride march. The introductory display, 'Welcome to Queer Britain', consisted of material from the museum's photography archive. The first full exhibition, 'We Are Queer Britain', occupying all three galleries, opened in July. The exhibition won Best Small Museum Project 2022, awarded by The Museums Association as part of their Museums Change Lives campaign. When not on display, the museum's collection is housed at the Bishopsgate Institute.

The museum closed in November 2025 for refurbishing, reopening in February 2026. A new collections gallery was added, with collections branching off into six major themes:

- Resist!
- Club Kids
- Queer Creativity
- Body and Mind
- Live, Laugh, Love
- The World Around Us

These new collections display new materials, including stories on the Black Lesbian and Gay Centre, Club Kali, the Women's liberation music movement, the UK AIDS Memorial Quilt, and the relationship between Bloomsbury group members Lytton Strachey and Dora Carrington. New special exhibitions unveiled in February 2026, titled "Queer Print" and "40 Years of BFI Flair."

== See also ==
- List of museums in London
- Schwules Museum
