= Museum of Wimbledon =

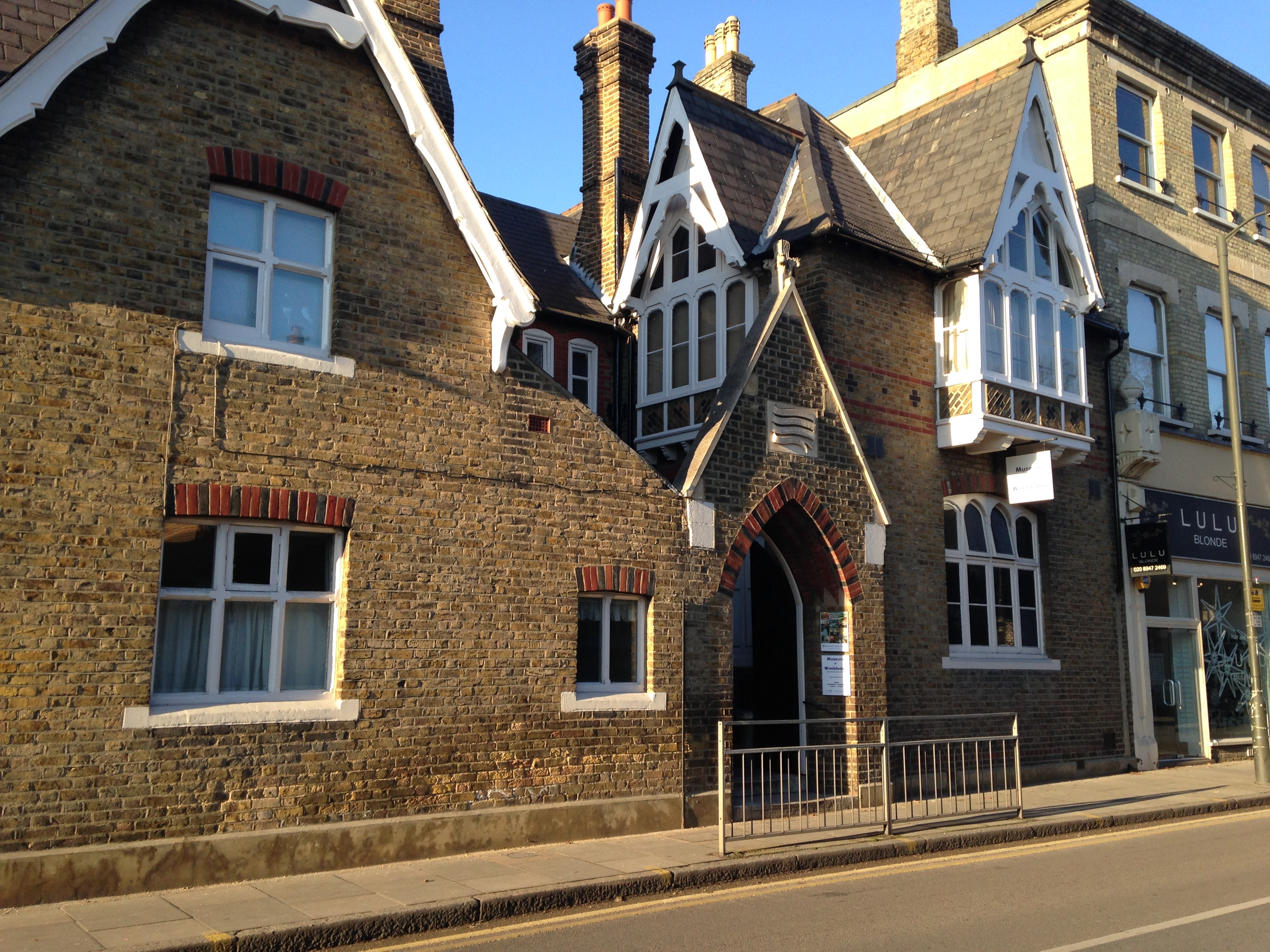
- Location: Wimbledon; London, SW19; United Kingdom
- Coordinates: 51°25′25″N 0°13′00″W
- Type: History museum
- Public transit access: Wimbledon
- Website: wimbledonsociety.org.uk/museum/

The Museum of Wimbledon now renamed the Wimbledon Museum is a local history museum at 22 Ridgway, Wimbledon, in the London Borough of Merton. The museum was established in 1916. Run by The Wimbledon Society and staffed by volunteers, it is open on Friday, Saturday and Sunday from 2:30 to 5pm

The Wimbledon Museum is adjacent to the Norman Plastow Gallery, which is used for photographic and other exhibitions.
