= Arsenal Football Club Museum =

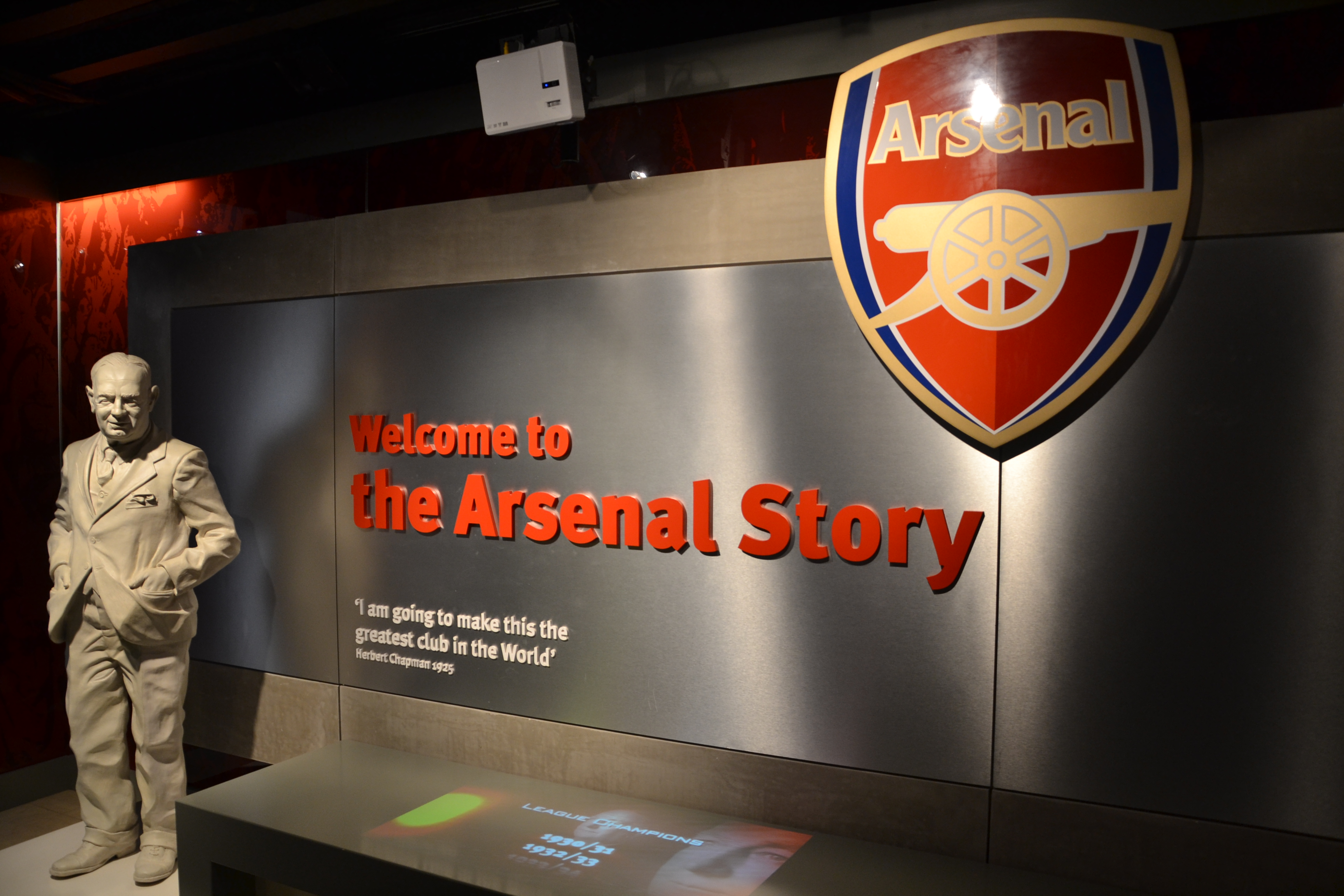
- Established: 1993; 33 years ago
- Location: Holloway; London, N5; England
- Coordinates: 51.556548°N 0.108103°W
- Type: Sports museum
- Visitors: 120,000 per year
- Public transit access: Arsenal; Drayton Park

The Arsenal Football Club Museum is a museum in Holloway, London, run by Arsenal Football Club and dedicated to the history of the club.

The museum houses a wide range of exhibits and memorabilia from throughout the club's history, including Charlie George's shirt from the 1971 FA Cup Final, Michael Thomas's boots from Arsenal's 1988–89 title-deciding match against Liverpool, Alan Smith's shirt from the 1994 UEFA Cup Winners' Cup Final and a custom trophy commemorating Arsenal's 2003–04 Premier League season, where they won the title unbeaten.

The museum is currently housed in the Northern Triangle Building, to the immediate north of Emirates Stadium, the club's home ground. It had been previously housed inside the North Bank Stand of Arsenal's Highbury stadium from the stand's opening in 1993 to 2006, when Highbury was closed and redeveloped. It currently attracts over 120,000 visitors a year.

The museum is open every day of the week. On matchdays the museum is only open from 10am till half an hour before kick-off. Admission is also included as part of tours of Emirates Stadium.
