= William Booth Memorial Training College =

William Booth College
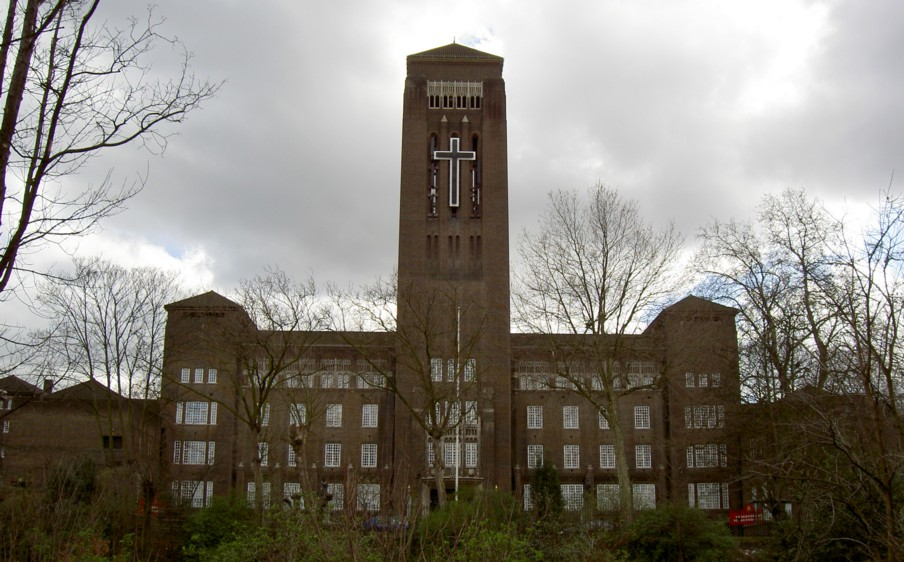
- Looking towards the main building at William Booth College
- Interactive map of the William Booth College area

General information
- Type: Training college
- Location: Opposite Denmark Hill railway station, Champion Park, London, Greater London SE5 8BQ, United Kingdom, England
- Coordinates: 51.4677°N 0.0886°W
- Construction started: 8 July 1929
- Renovated: 2010
- Owner: The Salvation Army

Design and construction
- Architect: Giles Gilbert Scott

Website
- Website

William Booth College on Champion Park, Denmark Hill in the London Borough of Southwark, is the headquarters of The Salvation Army leadership and officer training which delivers education and training programmes for the United Kingdom. Designed by Sir Giles Gilbert Scott, the college is a memorial to William Booth.

The college has been listed Grade II on the National Heritage List for England since September 1972.

== History and opening ==
The college was proposed by William Booth's son Bramwell just after his father William's death, as a tribute to him. On 8 July 1929, the college was officially opened by HRH Prince George. The foundation stone was laid in 1928 and the college was completed in 1932.

== Renovation ==
In 2010, the college went under repair in many areas due to subsidence and the interior was in need of updating. By 2012, the renovation was completed and most of the interior was brought up to date.

== The building ==
The main building consists of an Assembly hall which is used on Sundays for the main services as well as other events. There is a library and a museum which visitors can access. The lounge area, known to the residents as The Hub is a single-storey development which links the Assembly hall to the main entrance. This provides cadets with a "friendly" free-time space.

The Canteen area is situated in a separate block. Adjacent to the canteen is a function room which is used to host social and fundraising events put on by the college.

=== Accommodation ===
The accommodation varies; while some flats may have up to three bedrooms, others may only have one. Most of the guest accommodation is in Blocks 3 and 4 at the college.

== Training ==
The training Cadets will usually stay at William Booth College for two years while they complete their leadership or officer training. If they are newly appointed they might go back to the college before their second Salvation Army appointment with a new corps.
