= House of Dreams (film) =

- Original promotional artwork
- Directed by: Robert Berry
- Screenplay by: Robert Berry
- Starring: Robert Berry; Pauline Elliott; Lance Bird; Charlene Bradley
- Cinematography: Robert Berry; Lance Bird; Roger Sanders; Ed Stewart
- Edited by: Robert Berry
- Music by: Abbe Esben
- Production company: Melpomene Production Co.
- Release date: September 11, 1963 (Vincennes, Indiana)
- Running time: 71 minutes
- Country: United States
- Language: English
- Budget: $10,000

House of Dreams is a 1963 American psychological horror film directed, written by, and starring Robert Berry, with Pauline Elliott, Lance Bird, and Charlene Bradley in supporting roles.

== Production ==
=== Development ===
House of Dreams was conceived by 22-year-old Indiana University Bloomington student and Decker native Robert Berry, who set the film in and around a real abandoned house in Decker, Indiana.

=== Casting ===
The cast of the film was sourced locally. Actress Pauline Elliott was originally from England, and was living in Warsaw, Indiana at the time of filming. Lance Bird, 21 years old at the time of filming, was a student at Indiana University Bloomington.

Berry had not originally intended to star in the film, and cast an actor out of California for the lead role, but ultimately took over the part after he dropped out of the project.

=== Filming ===
Principal photography took place in the summer of 1962 in the abandoned residence, with some additional photography occurring in Vincennes. Filming began on June 10, and took place almost exclusively at night. The film was shot on a budget of $10,000.

== Release ==
Republic Pictures originally planned to release the film as a supplementary feature for their film releases of May 1963.

The film had its premiere at the New Moon Theater in Vincennes, Indiana on September 11, 1963. Following its premiere, the film screened at some theaters in the midwest, including in Indiana and Illinois.

Executive Isam Yusbachi of International Films Co. considered screening the film in Belgium and other French-speaking territories, while the South American distributor Peli-Mex also contacted Berry, expressing interest in releasing the film in Latin America and several European countries; however, it is unknown if the film was given distribution in these regions.

=== Home media ===
Bleeding Skull released House of Dreams on Blu-ray in April 2026.
