= Granary Square =

Urban square in the London Borough of Camden

Coordinates: 51°32′8″N 0°7′30″W

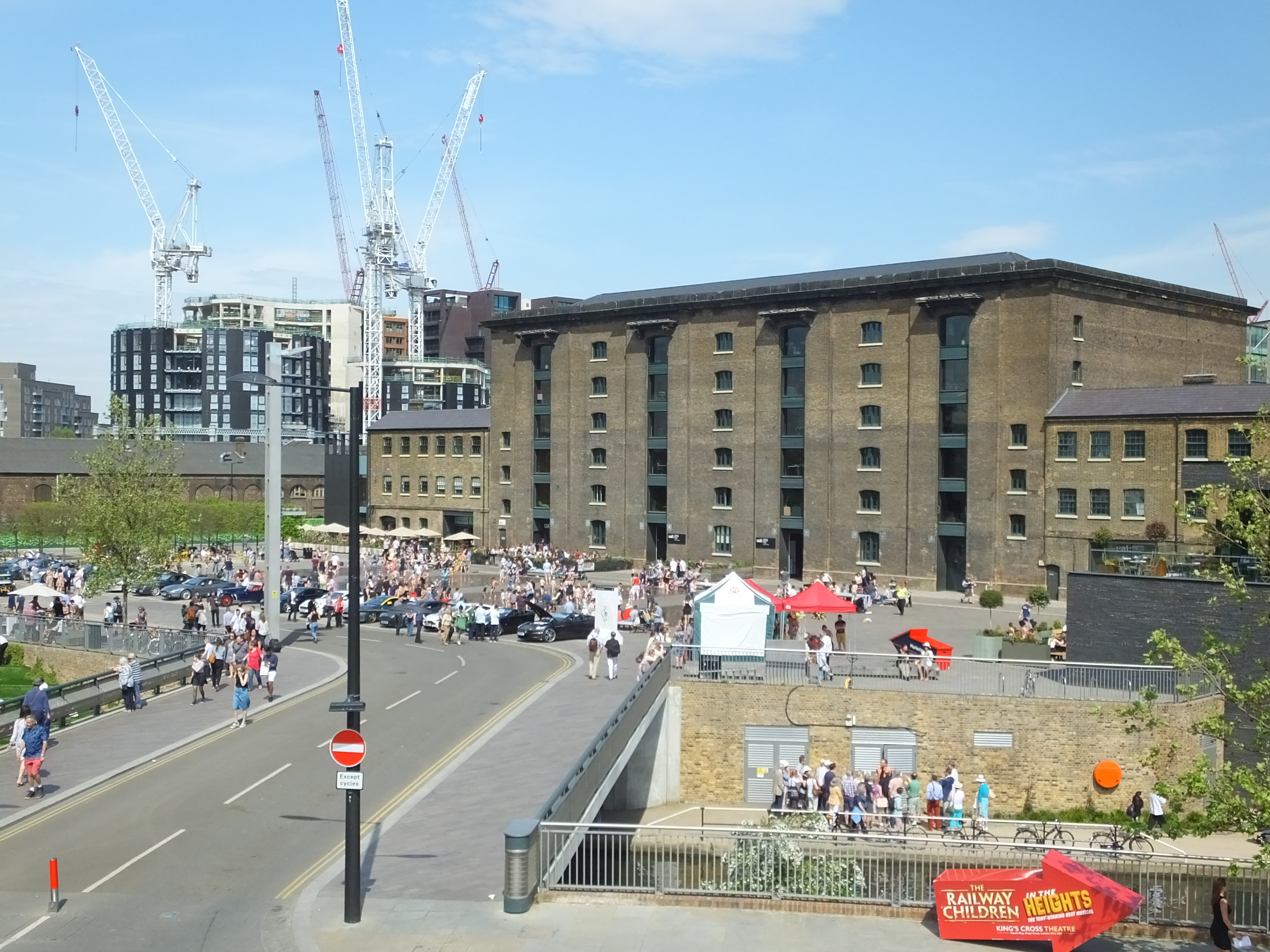
Road bridge to Granary Square with Central Saint Martins college behind

Granary Square is a large open space in the London Borough of Camden. Comparable in size to Trafalgar Square, it is part of the larger King's Cross Central development. It has been cited as an example of a privately owned public space in London. The new Central Saint Martins complex is adjacent. Visitor attractions in the square include Queer Britain, the UK's first dedicated museum of LGBT history and culture.

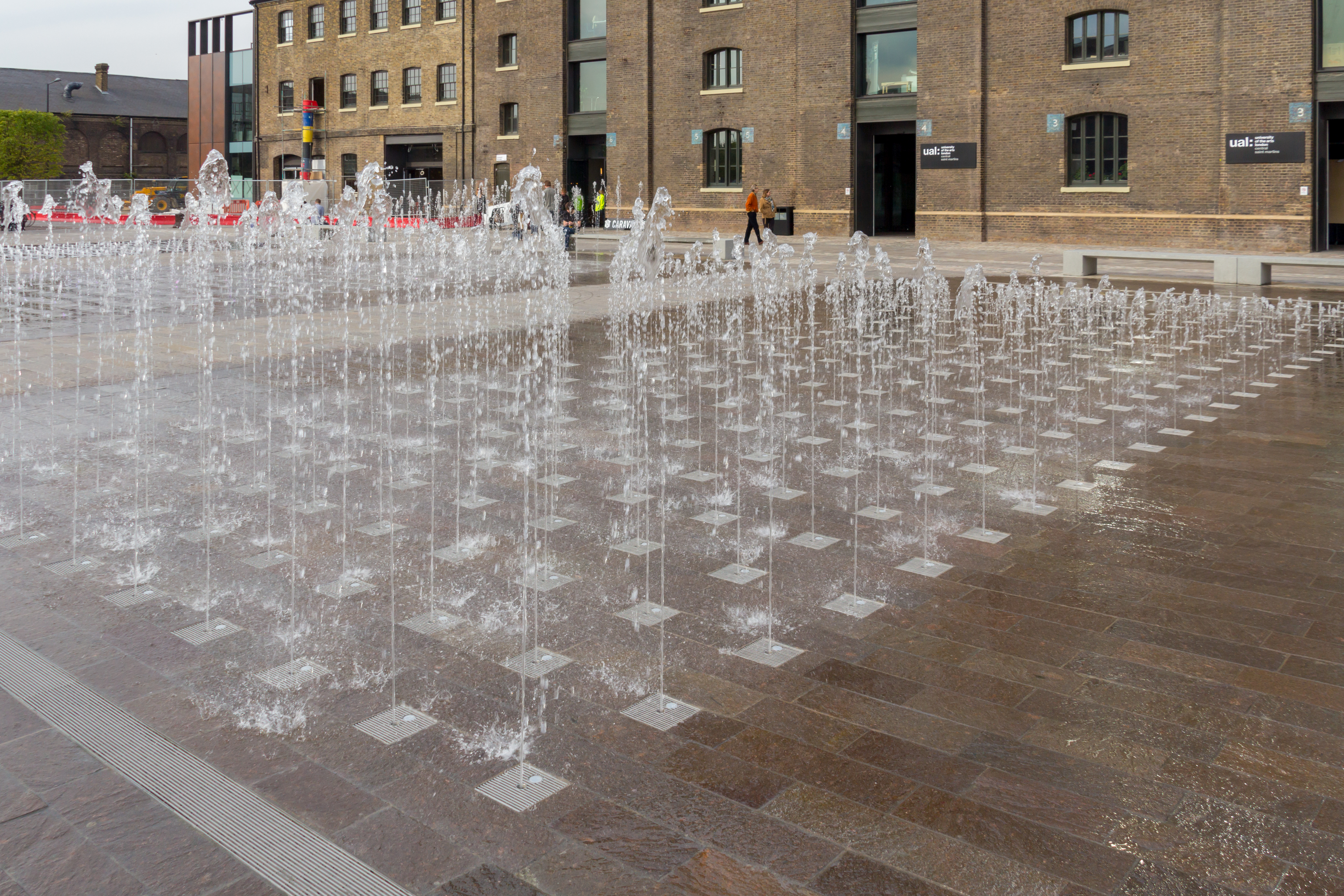
Granary Square fountain in 2012

The square incorporates a fountain consisting of 1,080 individual jets rising from the flush paved surface of the plaza. Each jet has its own independently controlled pump and multi-color illumination. As of March 2015, visitors to the square can interact with the fountains to play a mobile version of the Snake game.

Other squares in the development will include Station Square, Pancras Square, Cubitt Square, and North Square.
