= Winston Churchill's Britain At War Experience =

Winston Churchill's Britain at War Experience
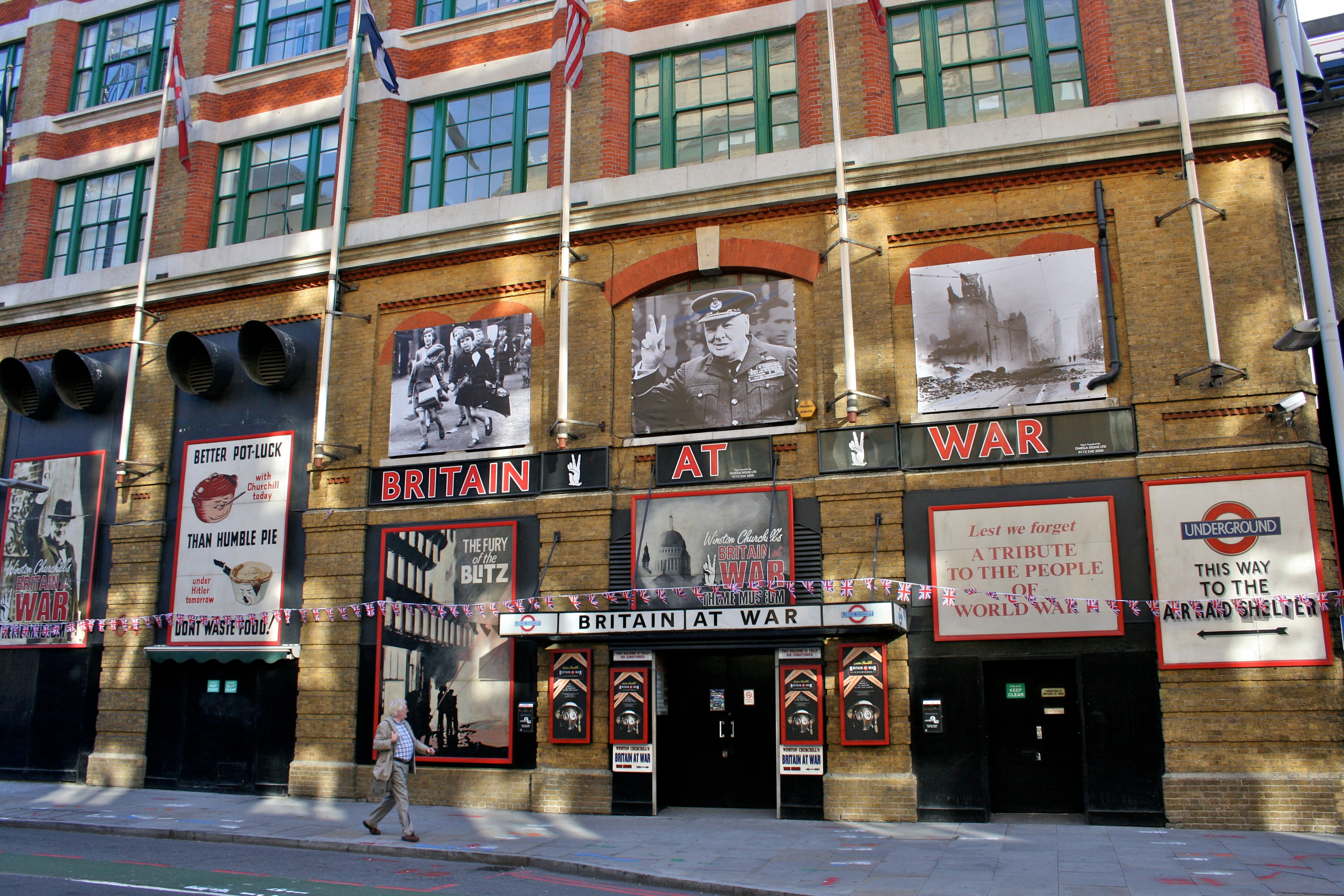

- Location within Central London
- Dissolved: 2013
- Location: 64-66 Tooley Street, London SE1 2TF, England, UK
- Coordinates: 51.505779°N 0.084356°W
- Public transit access: London Bridge
- Website: www.britainatwar.co.uk

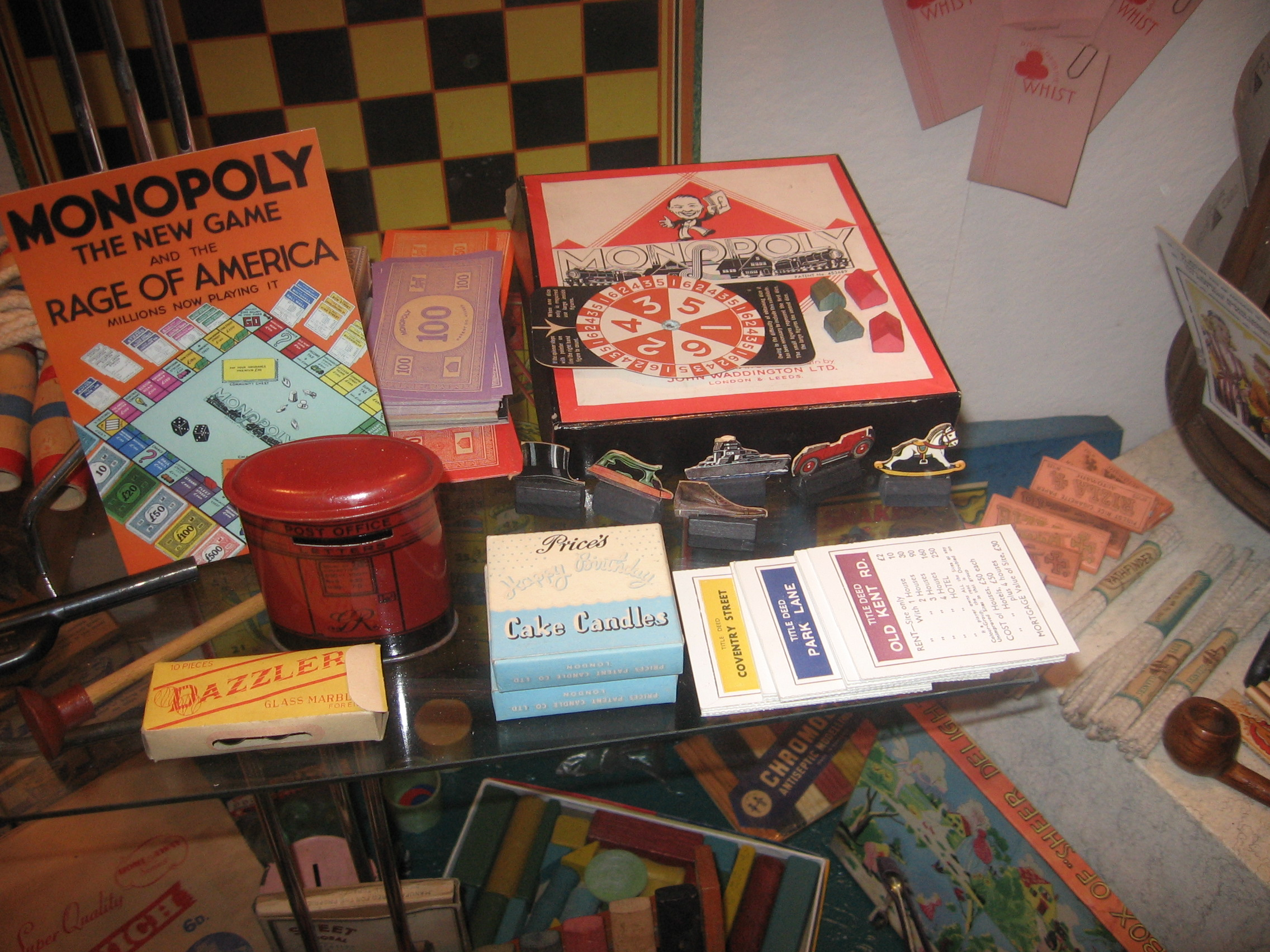
Exhibits in the museum

The Winston Churchill's Britain at War Experience was from 1992 to 2013 a themed museum located in central London, which recalled the London Blitz.

== Description ==
The museum gave a realistic picture of life in war-torn London.

The museum closed in January 2013. Its collections have been transferred to The Bay Trust.
