= Campbell Works =

Coordinates: 51.5655°N 0.0707°W

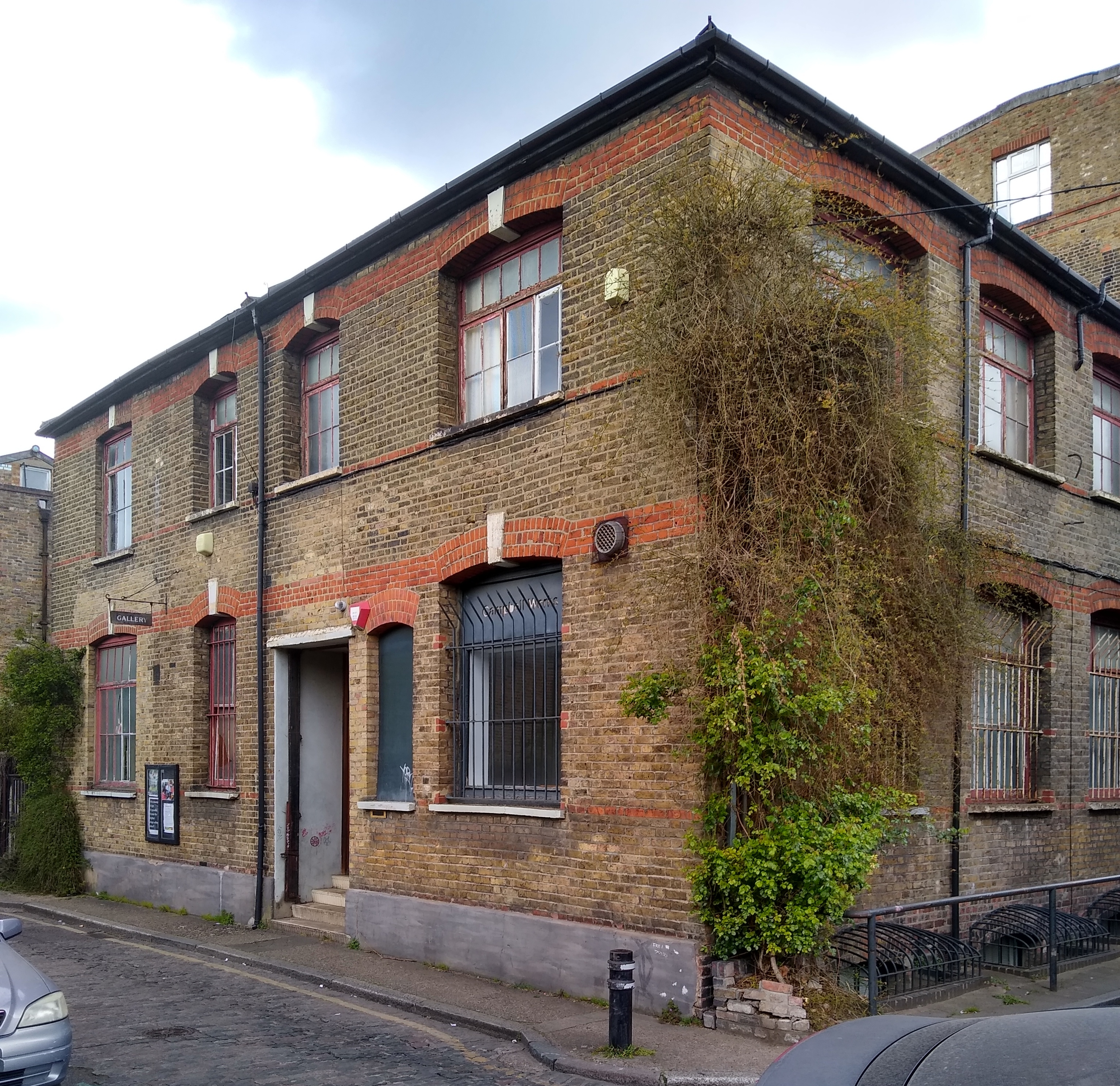
Campbell Works

Campbell Works is the creative partnership of artists Neil Taylor and Harriet Murray established in 2004 in London. It runs a programme of contemporary art exhibitions, public engagement projects, publications and education schemes. By initiating and developing collaborative frameworks and creating a platform for new curatorial projects, Campbell Works acts as a meeting point for ideas and explores contextual relationships between art, spaces and people.

== Projects ==
As well as their own work Campbell Works generates collaborative projects with artists, musicians, curators and scientists. Their studio practice extends to running an artist led gallery space, initiating and curating art projects, and undertaking a wide range of public realm interventions. Recent projects include:

- Mind Mine
- On Trust
- The Pimp Car Project
- Streets for People
- You Turn / Jake and Dino Chapman
- EachTeach
- Scalp 19:9:9

The gallery has also hosted a series of group and solo exhibitions of new and established artists, including Shane Bradford, Shaun Doyle and Mally Mallinson, Jake and Dinos Chapman and Ami Clarke. Accompanying events include talks by Richard Wentworth, screenings of movies such as Mondo Cane and live gigs with artists Anne Bean and Richard Wilson, Stephen Cornford and Tone poem.

== Publications ==
Works is an extension of the exhibition space in the form of a newspaper, and is published by Campbell Works on the occasions of new projects to act as a wider discussion around their themes, thinking and visual language. It is distributed at many art venues in London and purchase is free. Works is the new parent for its surrogate offspring, Artinit.

== The building ==
Located in North London, the Campbell Works building used to be one of many warehouses comprising the Stoke Newington Brewery. Since 1997 its internal structure has constantly been reordered. Campbell Works holds a gallery space, a multi-purpose project room, artists' studios and the organisation's offices.
