= The Library at Willesden Green =

Public library complex and museum in Willesden Green, London

Willesden Library
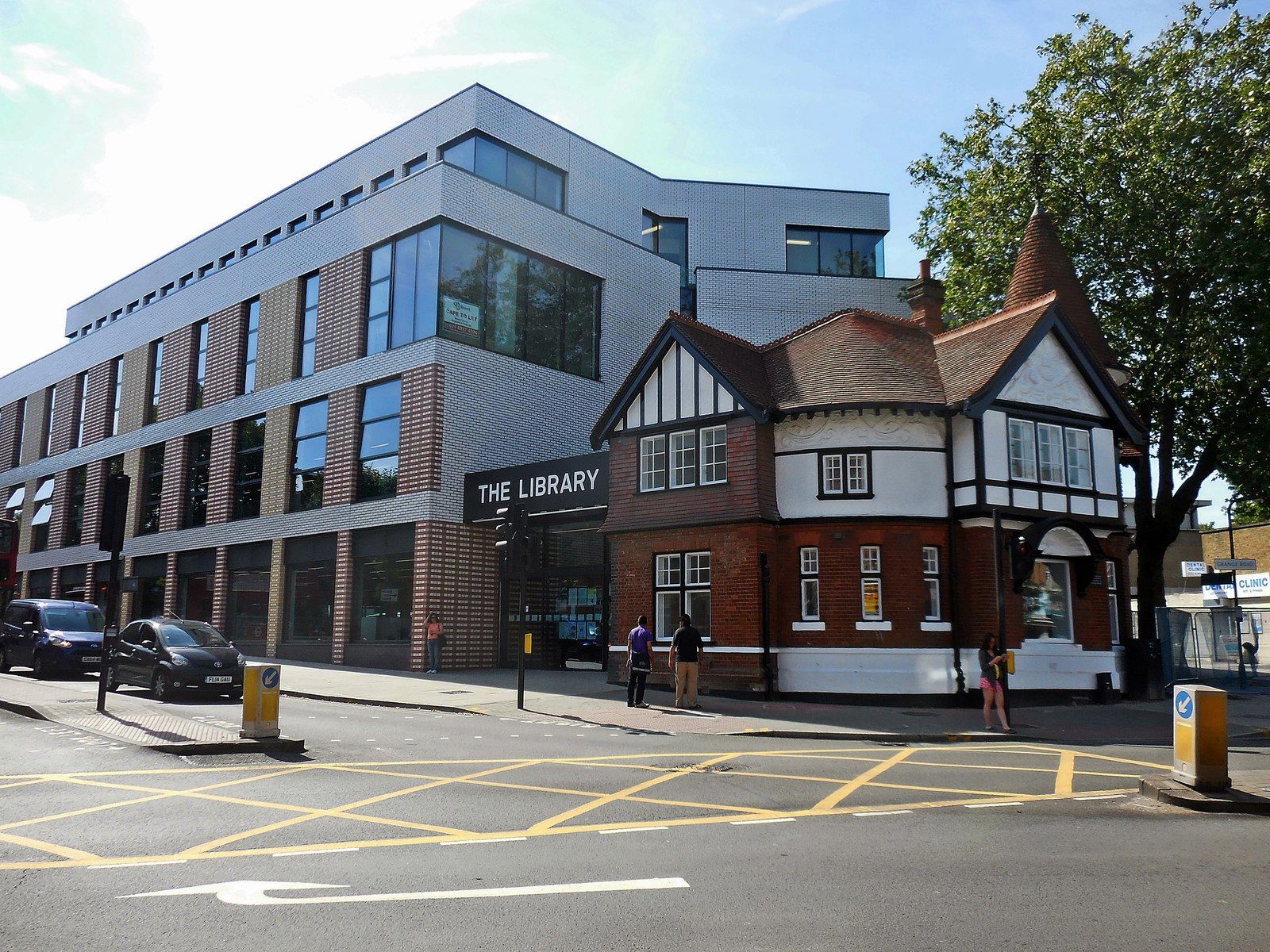
- The Library after refurbishment in 2015
- 51°32′48″N 0°13′44″W
- Location: Willesden Green, London, United Kingdom
- Type: Public library
- Established: 1894
- Branch of: London Borough of Brent

The Library at Willesden Green (simply known as Willesden Library) is a public library complex situated in Willesden Green, London, United Kingdom. The centre includes a public library which spans over 3 floors, and includes a library for children. It includes 40,000 books, and offers computer and study spaces. The library is operated by Brent Council and houses governmental archives on Brent. Since 2006, the Brent Museum has been located in the building and since the 2015 redevelopment, a performing arts space, as well as an art exhibition gallery, was added to the building.

The library is open to the public 7 days a week.

== History ==
=== 1894–1979: Opening ===
The original library was built in the 1890s. It officially opened on 18 July 1894 and was considered a grand occasion that included a concert of classical music and songs. It was later extended on 26 April 1907, when it was increased from one to two storeys. The area of Willesden was considered an area of decline as little to no redevelopment had taken place after the Second World War.

=== 1980–2010: Old complex ===
The library was rebuilt in the 1980s with a £5 million repayable loan over 60 years, to pay for it. Later a £3.1 million Lottery grant was awarded to allow the Brent Archives to move into the location. The building still incorporated elements from its Victorian heritage. It was rebranded as Willesden Green Library Centre. The Library centre was a public library but also housed a cinema and an independent bookshop named The Willesden Bookshop. The new library opened in 1989.

=== 2011–present: Refurbishment ===
Brent Council was taken to the High Court by Brent campaigners over its conclusion to close down six of the borough's libraries in a bid to cut council spending and help it save over £10m In 2011.

In 2012, the building closed for redevelopment. The redevelopment cost £10million and took three years to complete and reopened as The Library at Willesden Green in 2015. The new centre contains a public library, 40,000 books, an art gallery, a museum, an exhibition area and a performance space. It was designed by the team at Allford Hall Monaghan Morris and won numerous awards for its design including the Civic Trust Award (2017), RIBA London Region Award (2017), Brick Awards for Best Public Building (2016) and the WAF Civic and Community Award (2016).

== Brent Museum ==
Brent Museum initially opened up in 1977 as The Grange Museum of Community History in Neasden. It collects the history of the borough, housing over 10,000 items including artefacts, video and oral history recordings. The museum has collections of items that are over thousands of years old but also works with local people to update their collections. Many of its collections reflect working and domestic life in Brent. The museum has undergone several changes in line with the renovations of The Library. It is part of the Heritage Services of Brent. The museum moved to its current home in The Library at Willesden Green in 2006 where it was added to the first floor of the library in the old complex. Most artefacts in the museum directly correlate to the history of Brent and depends largely on donations and bequests.

With the redevelopment of the Library, the museum saw further renovations alongside it and was added to the second floor of The Library with updated collections and new interactive educational displays which visitants can interact with and implement other senses too. The museum contains a focus on the old Wembley Stadium, the British Empire Exhibition, and a display on the area's short-lived, nineteenth-century Watkin's Tower.

== Gallery ==
The original library after its 1907 extension

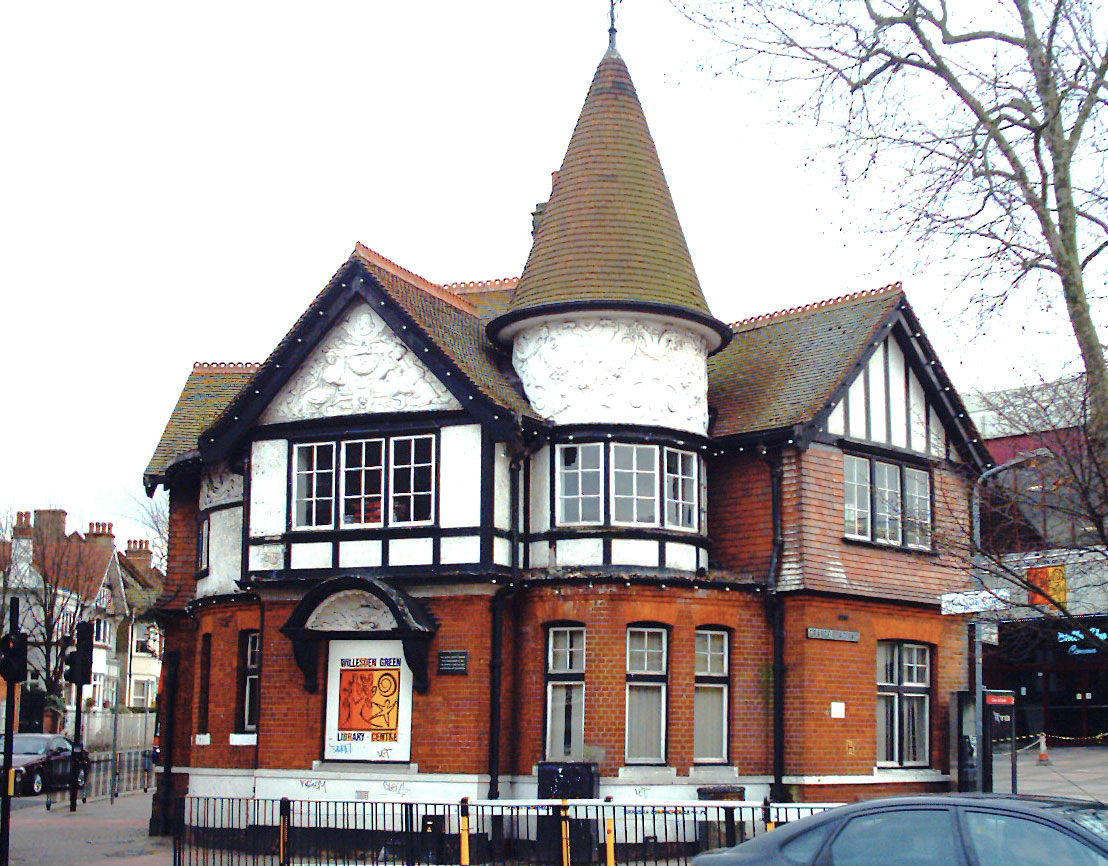
Original Victorian building, 2006

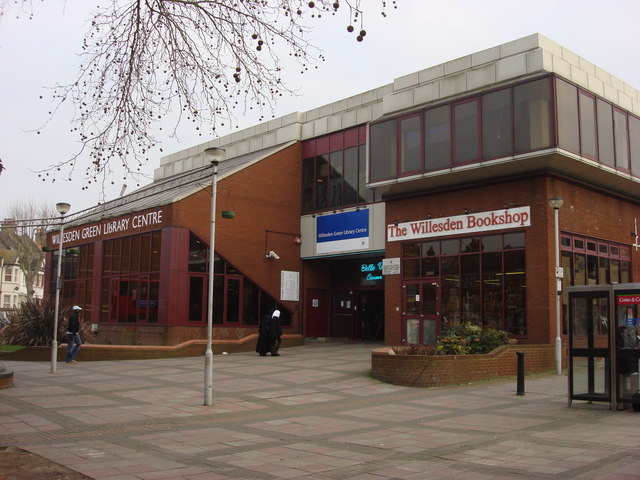
Old complex, 2008

== Popular culture ==
- British rapper Nines recorded some visuals for his single "Trapper of the Year" outside the library.
