= House of Dreams (museum) =

Art museum in East Dulwich, London

Coordinates: 51.4603379°N 0.07962°W

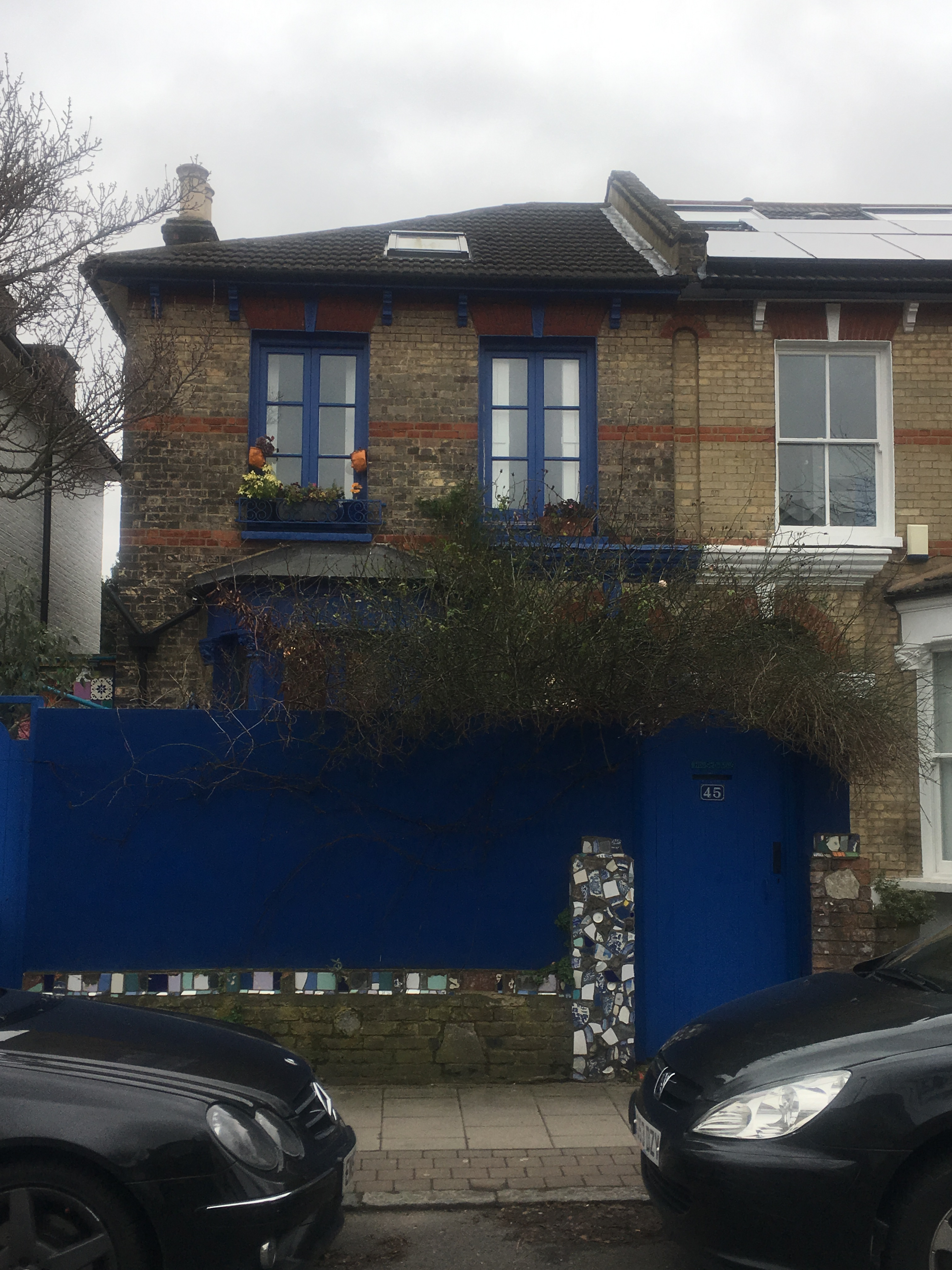
House of Dreams, 45 Melbourne Grove, East Dulwich.

The House of Dreams Museum is a terraced house in East Dulwich, England, transformed into the personal art museum of former textile designer and art director Stephen Wright. Wright worked on the museum in secret until the 2010s, when he began to open it to the public several days each year. It is now open to the public ten times a year usually on the last Saturday of the month. It is not open December to February. Booking for visits is available on the website.

== Background ==
Wright has lived in the house since 1982, and began developing it "just as something decorative" in 1998. He initially started the work with his partner, Donald Jones, completing a mosaic floor together. Jones died a few years after the couple began working on the house, as did Wright's parents, and Wright threw himself into the project as "a response to loss". The museum is dedicated to his dreams, life and love and as a monument to his dead partner and deceased parents. The museum is the subject of a BBC Radio 4 documentary available on BBC Sounds.

Wright, originally a fashion and textile designer, was influenced by seeing Jarvis Cocker's television series on outsider art, It featured the work of Bodan Litnianski and the folk arts of Mexico, South America and Asia. Along with his partner, Michael Vaughan, he has also visited Maison Picassiette in Chartres, France for inspiration. He has shown his work at the Halle St. Pierre in Paris. He also had a major exhibition of his work at The Secret Garden in Philadelphia in September 2024.

The entire ground floor, gardens and exterior has been turned into one sculpture, with rooms subdivided and every inch of the ceiling, walls, floors and space used as a canvas. Wright lives in a flat upstairs, which is currently habitable but he aims to complete the transformation of the entire house before he dies.

Wright sources the materials used both in the sculptures and mosaics at flea markets, and also through donations from visitors to the museum.

== Gallery ==
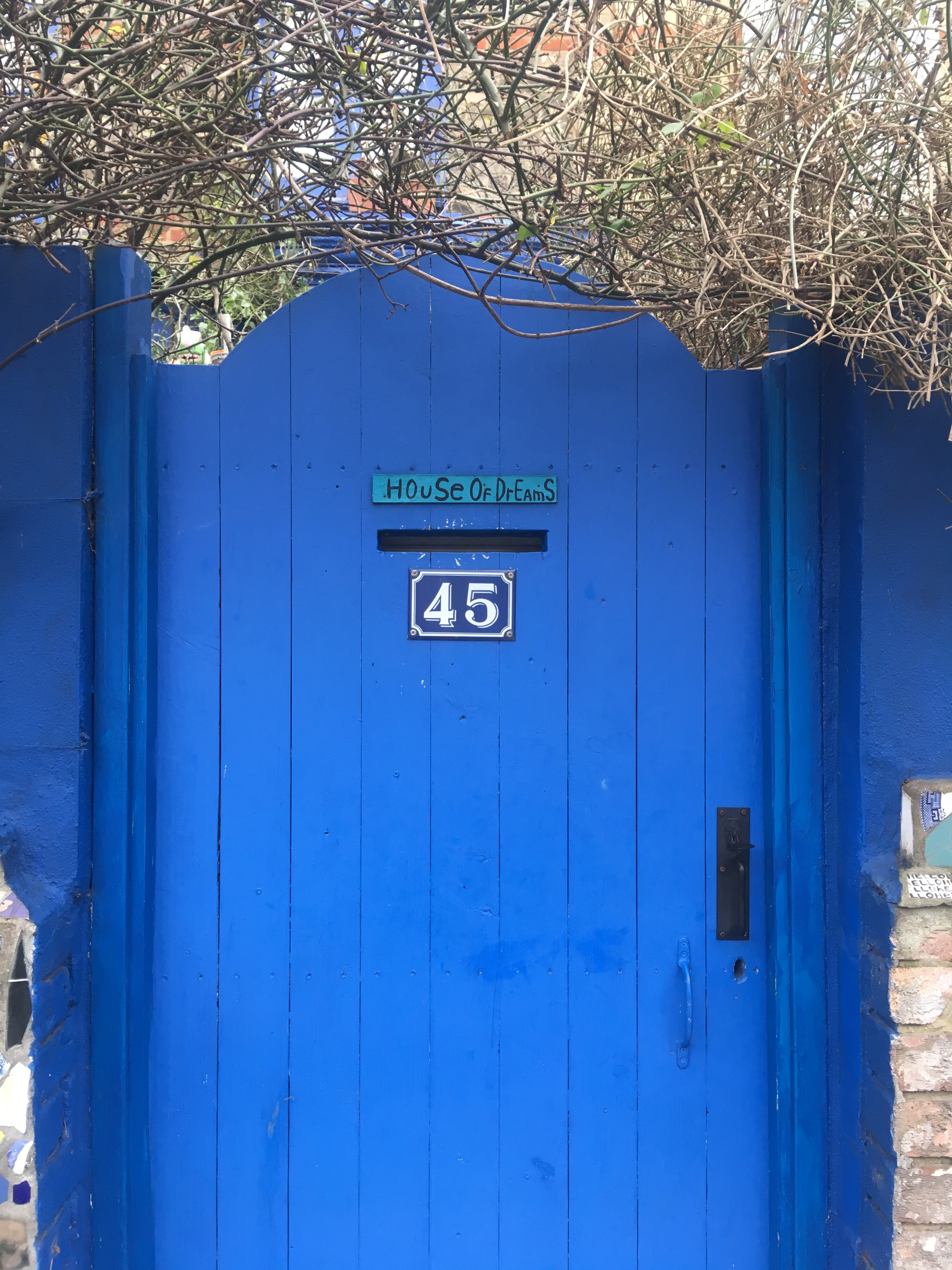

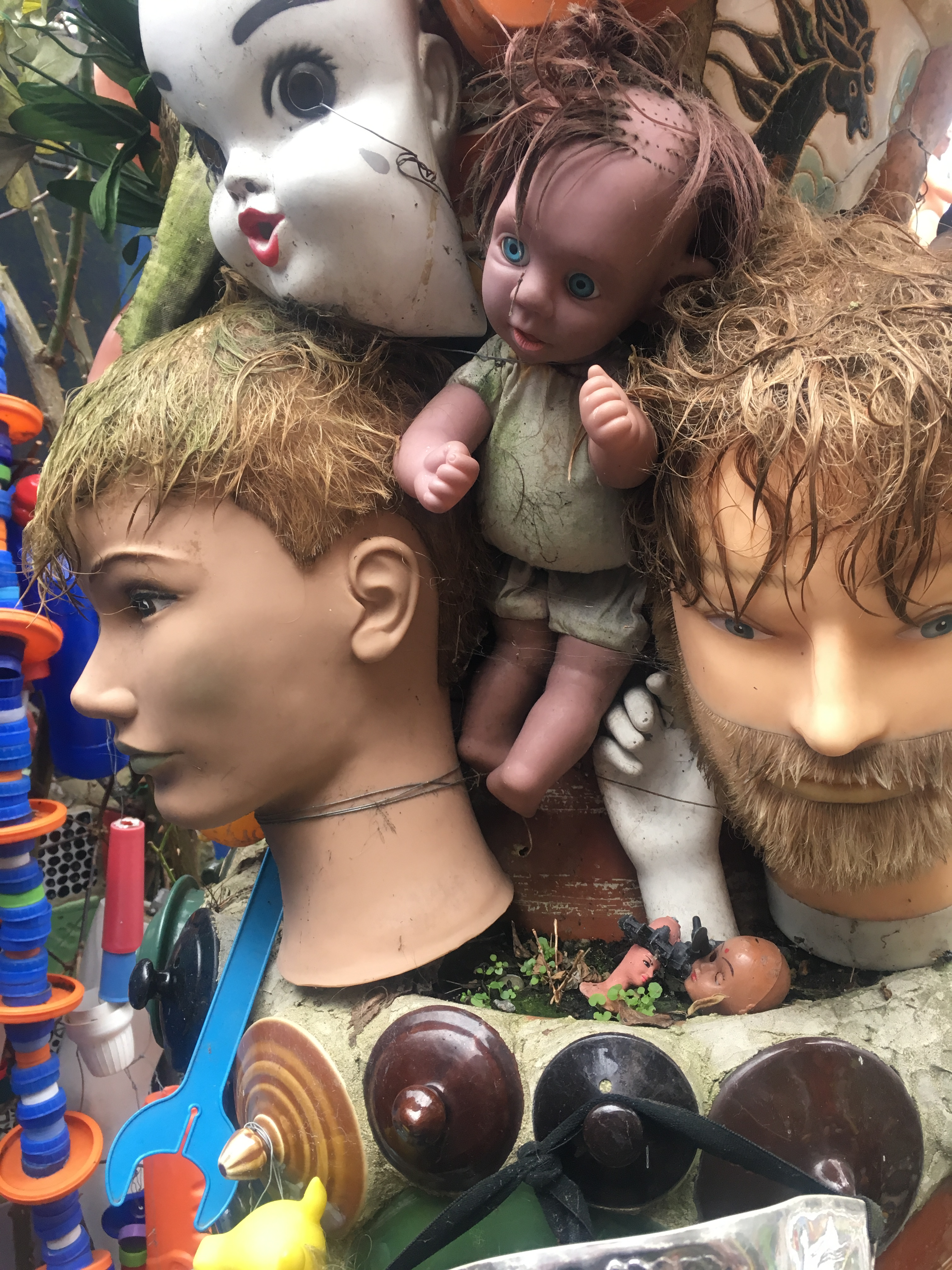

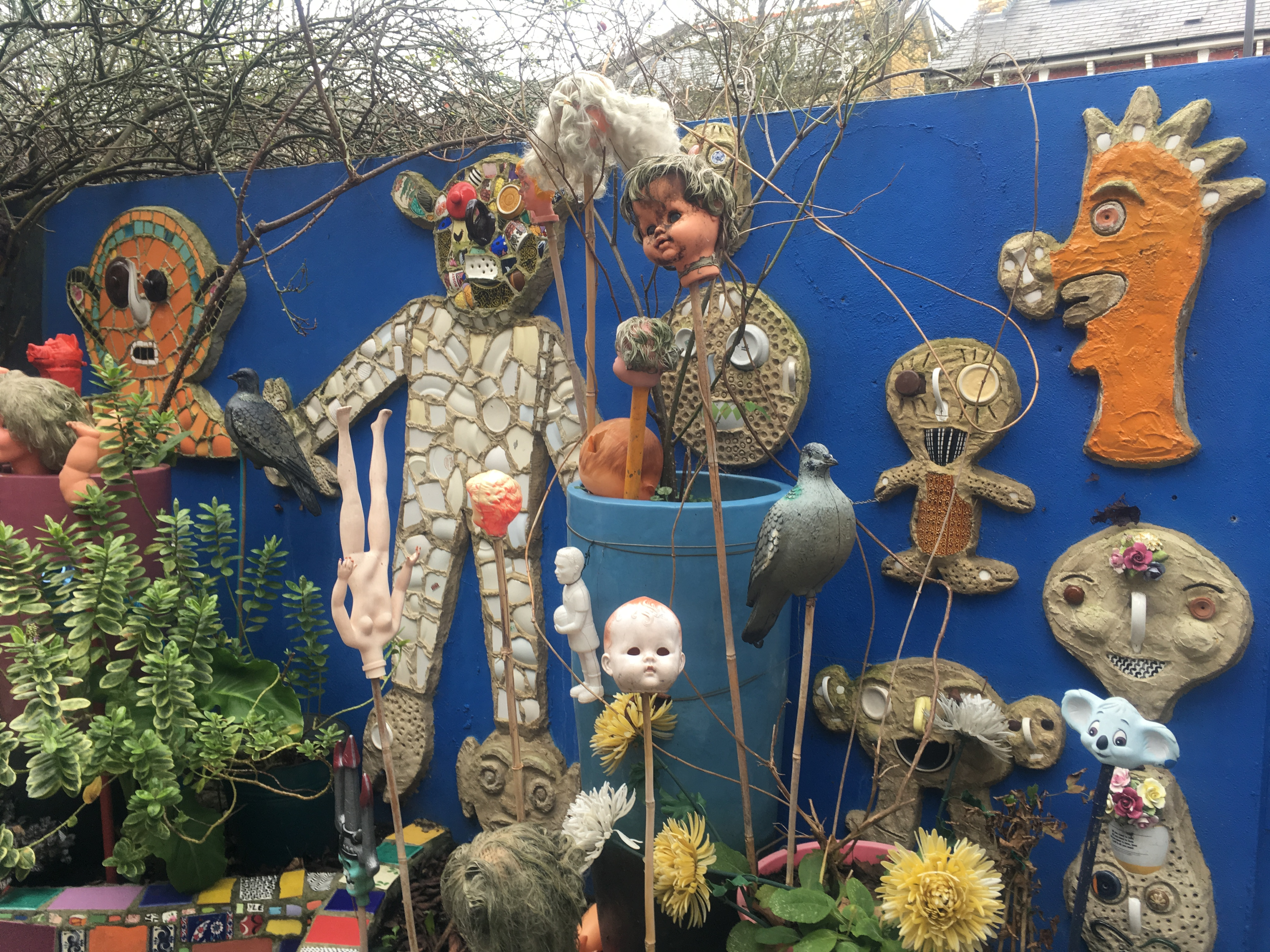

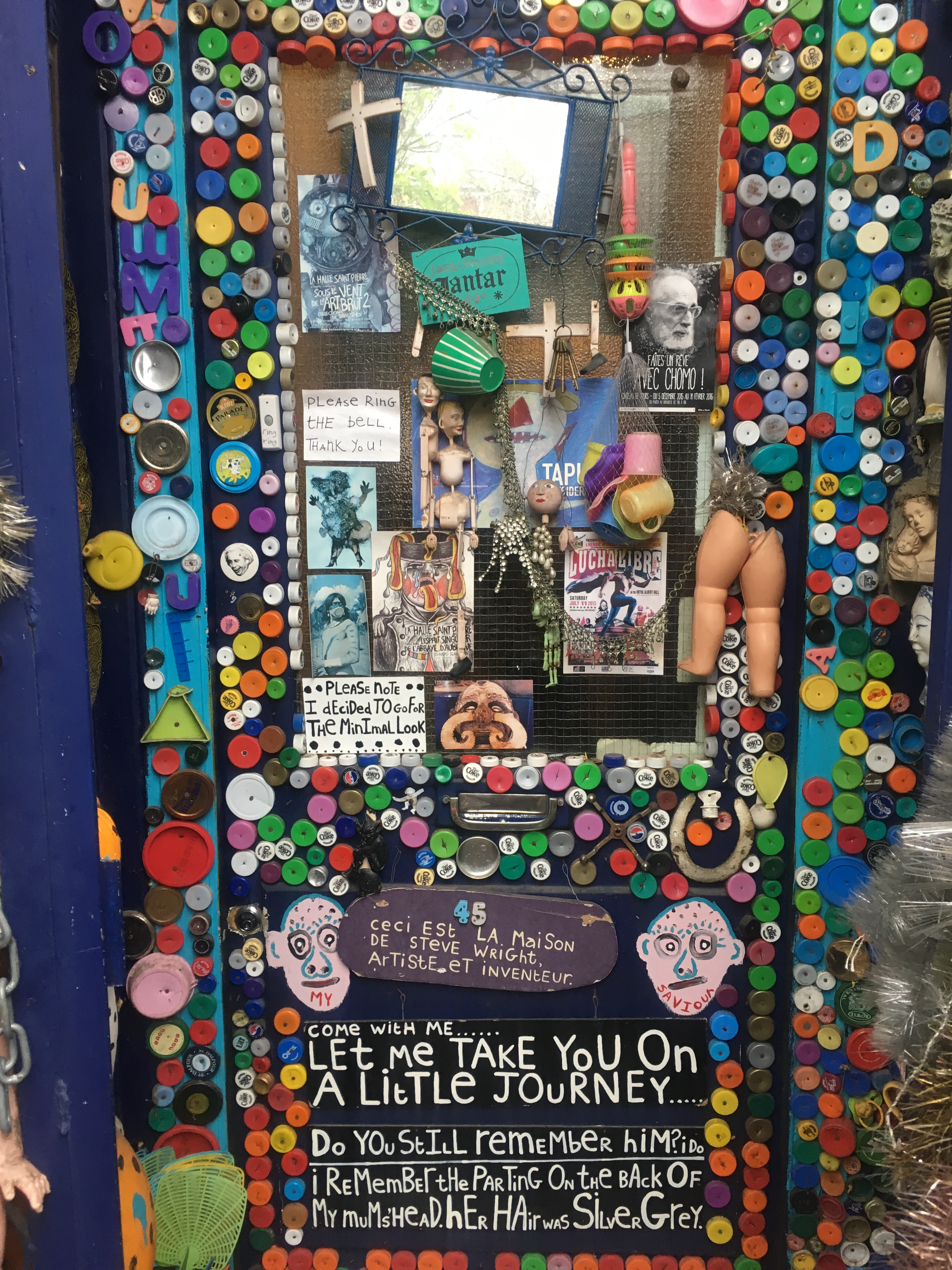

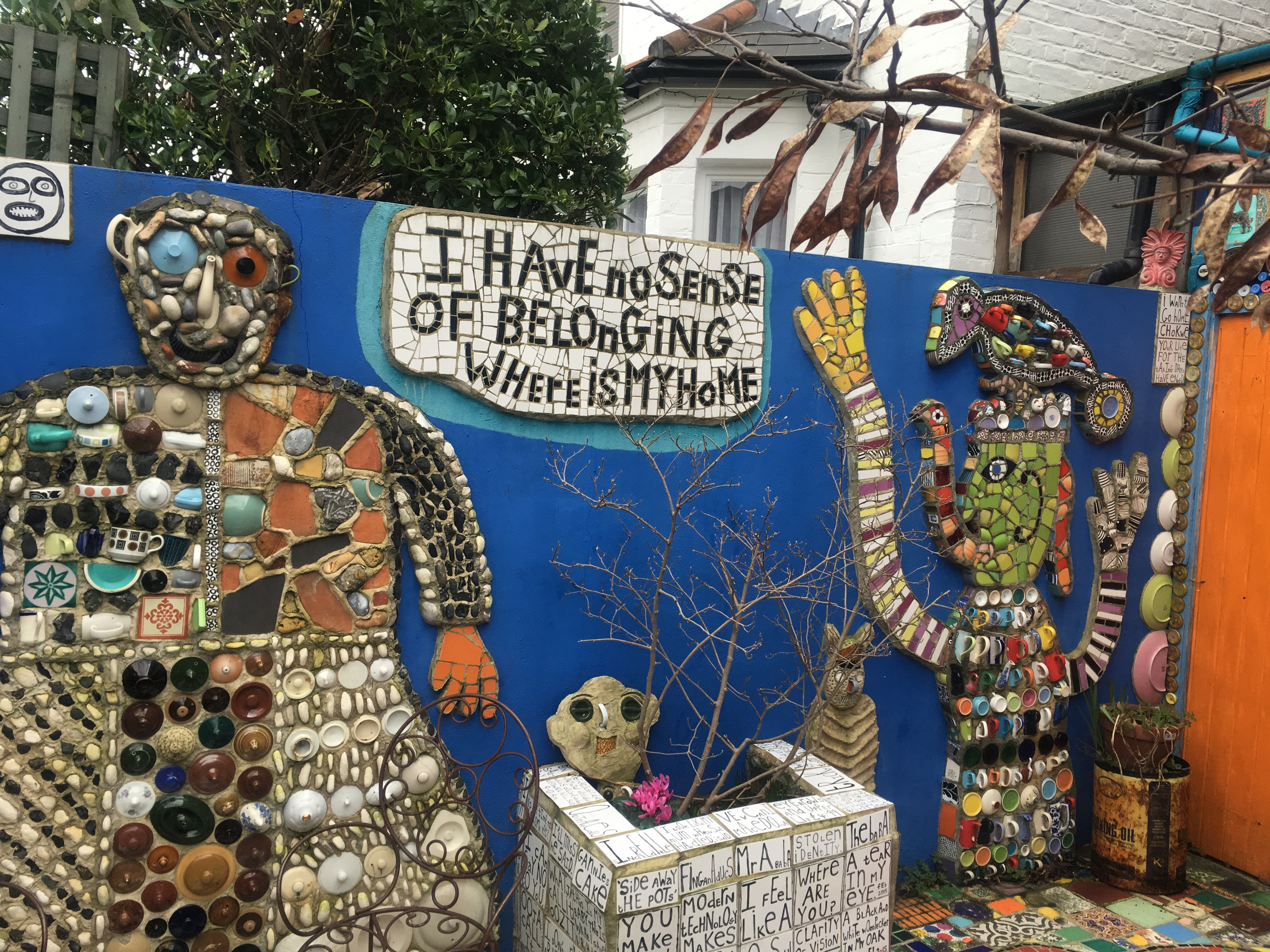

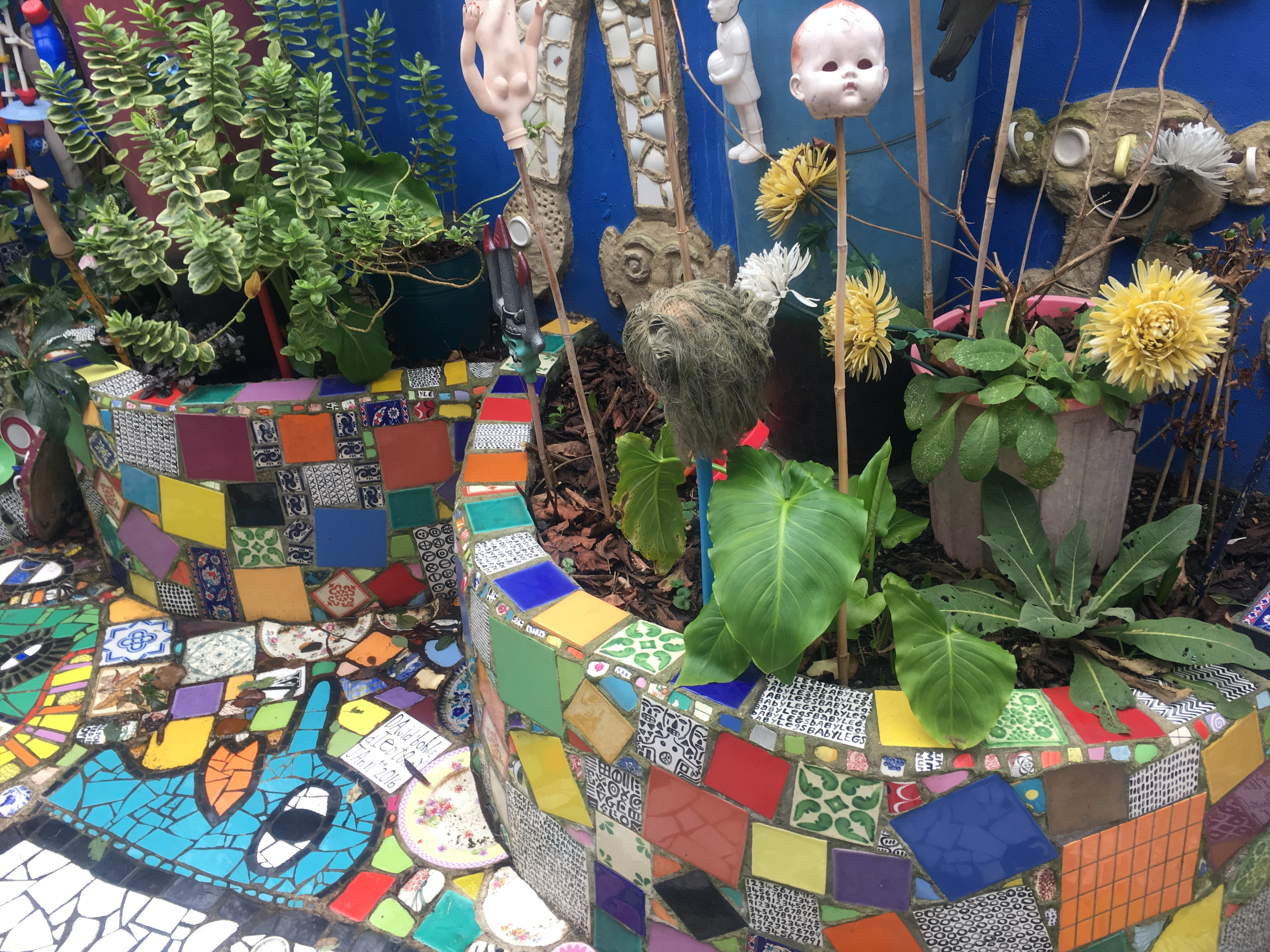

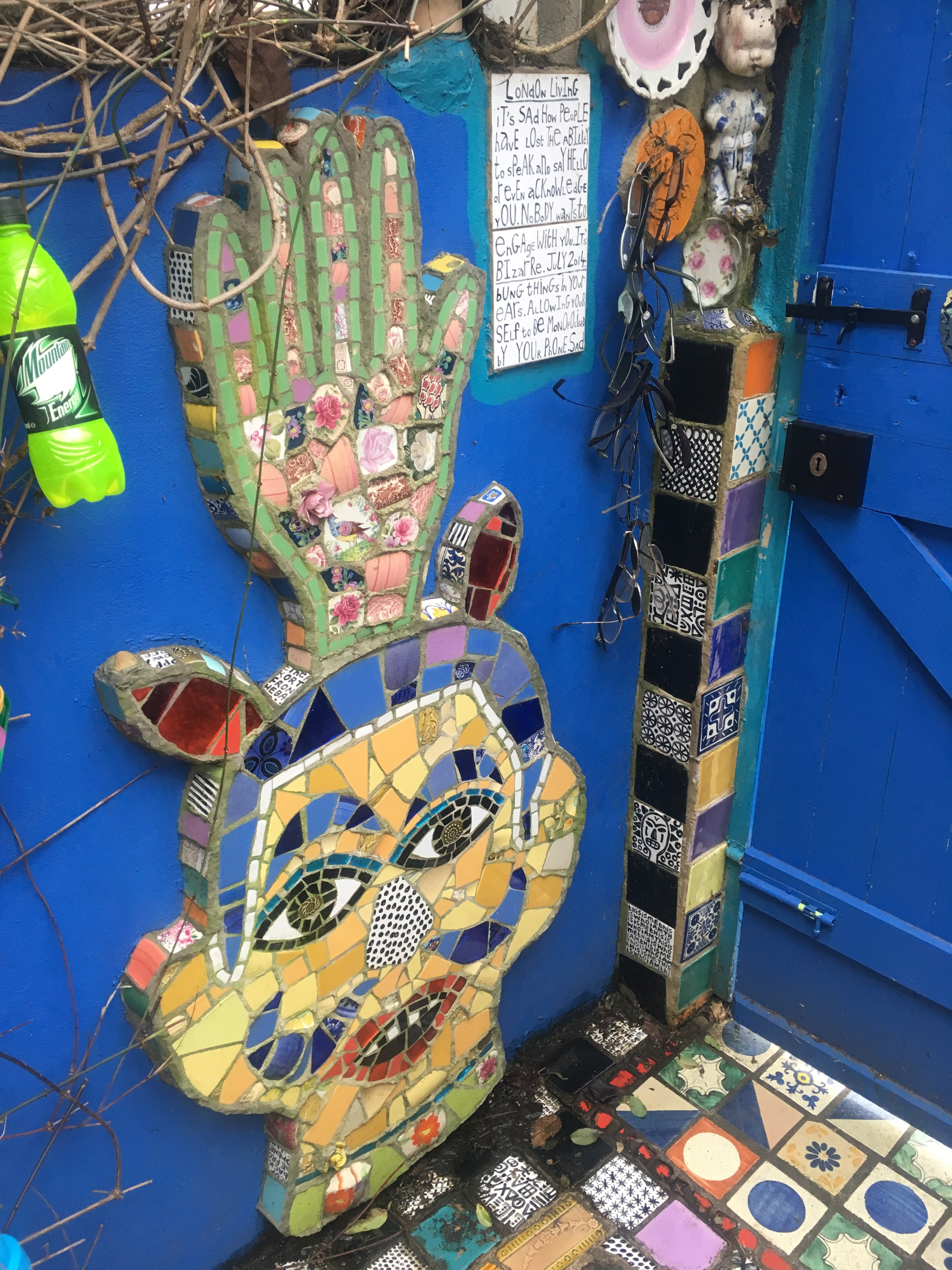
