= Freemasons' Hall, London =

Headquarters of the United Grand Lodge of England

Coordinates: 51.5151°N 0.1210°W

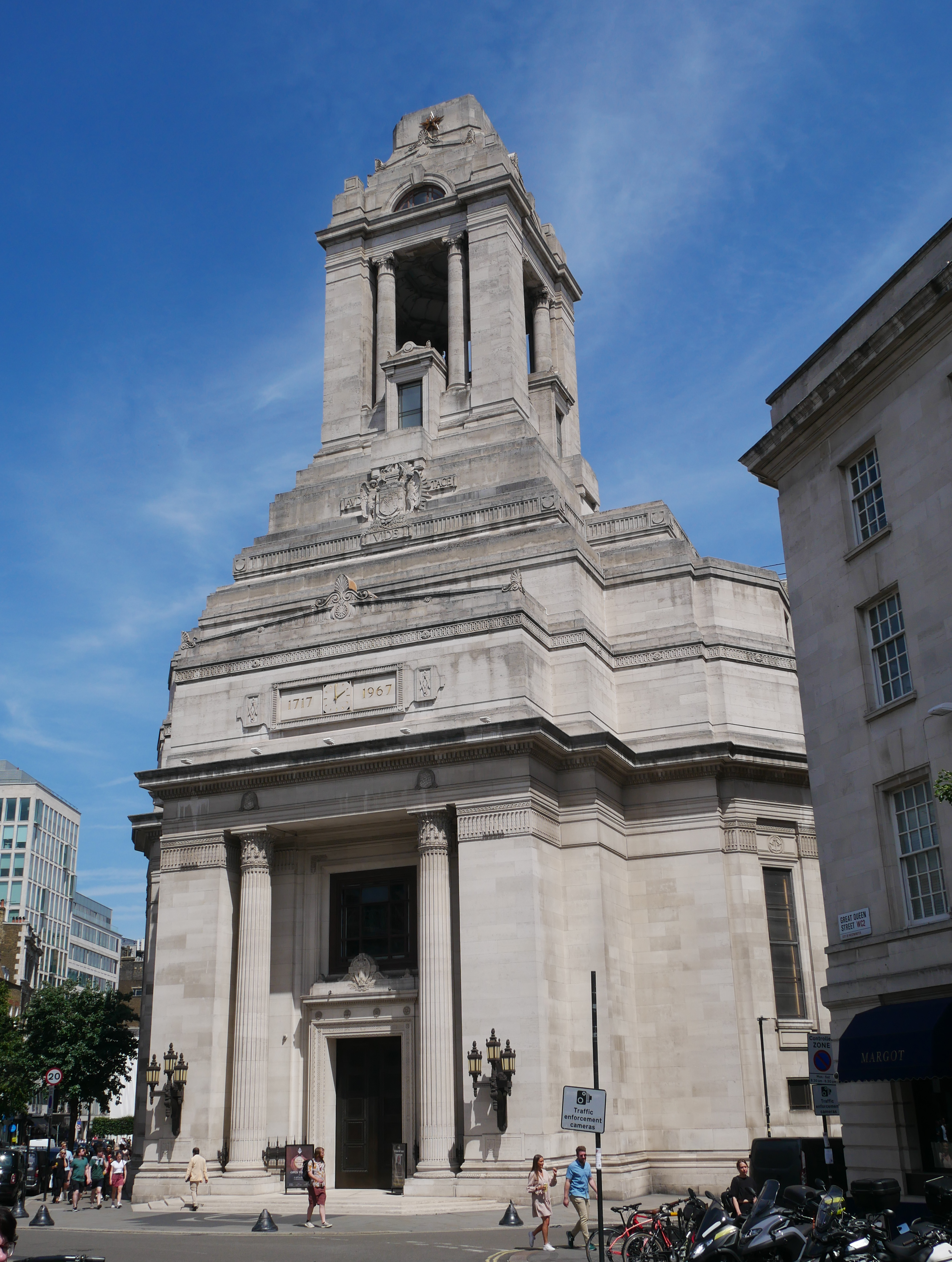
Freemasons' Hall in Great Queen Street, London

Freemasons' Hall in London is the headquarters of the United Grand Lodge of England and the Supreme Grand Chapter of Royal Arch Masons of England, as well as being a meeting place for many Masonic Lodges in the London area. It is located in Great Queen Street between Holborn and Covent Garden and has been a Masonic meeting place since 1775.

Parts of the building are open to the public daily, and its preserved classic Art Deco style, together with its regular use as a film and television location, have made it a tourist destination.

== First building (1775–1860) ==
In 1775 the premier Grand Lodge purchased a house fronting the street, behind which was a garden and a second house. A competition was held for the design of a Grand Hall to link the two houses. The front house was the Freemasons' Tavern, the back house was to become offices and meeting rooms. The winning design was by Thomas Sandby. It was dedicated on 23 May 1776.

An addition was added in 1820 by John Soane, though Soane's addition was demolished in 1860.

In 1846, the World Evangelical Alliance was founded here.

== Second building (1862–1925) ==
The original building was renovated and extended in 1862 with designs by Frederick Pepys Cockerell, who had drawn them up decades earlier. Weakened by an 1883 fire, the building was partially demolished in 1910.

== Current building (1933–present) ==
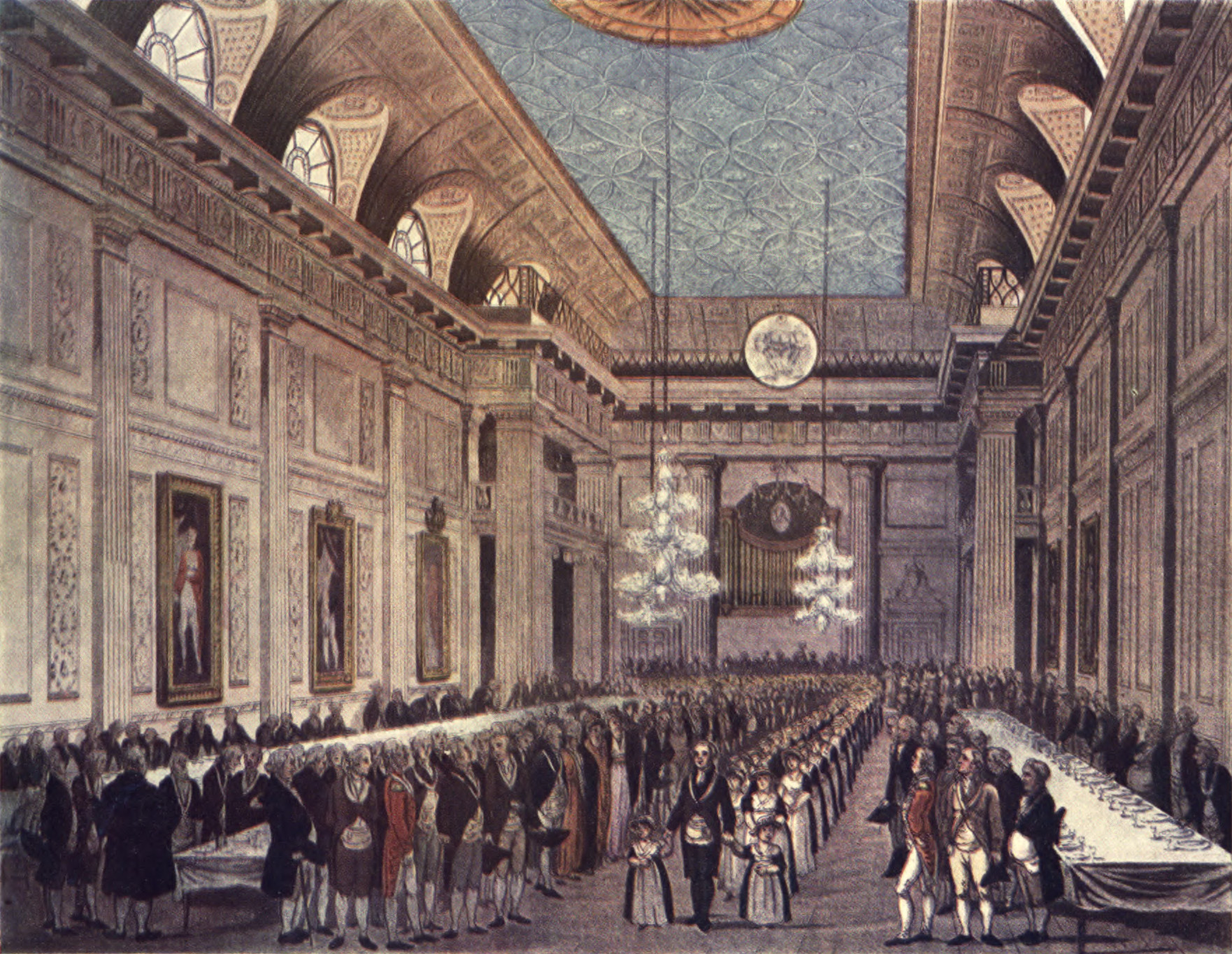
Freemasons' Hall, London, c. 1809

The current building, the third on this site, was built between 1927 and 1933 in the Art Deco style to the designs of architects Henry Victor Ashley and F. Winton Newman as a memorial to the 3,225 Freemasons who died on active service in World War I.

It is an Art Deco building, covering two and a quarter acres (0.9 ha). Initially known as the Masonic Peace Memorial, the name was changed to Freemasons' Hall at the outbreak of the World War II in 1939. The financing for building the hall was raised by the Masonic Million Memorial Fund. This fund raised over £1 million. It is a Grade II* listed building, both internally and externally.

In 1967, to mark the 250th anniversary of the foundation of the grand lodge in 1717, a clock was installed above the main entrance, flanked by the dates "1717" and "1967".

=== Grand Temple ===
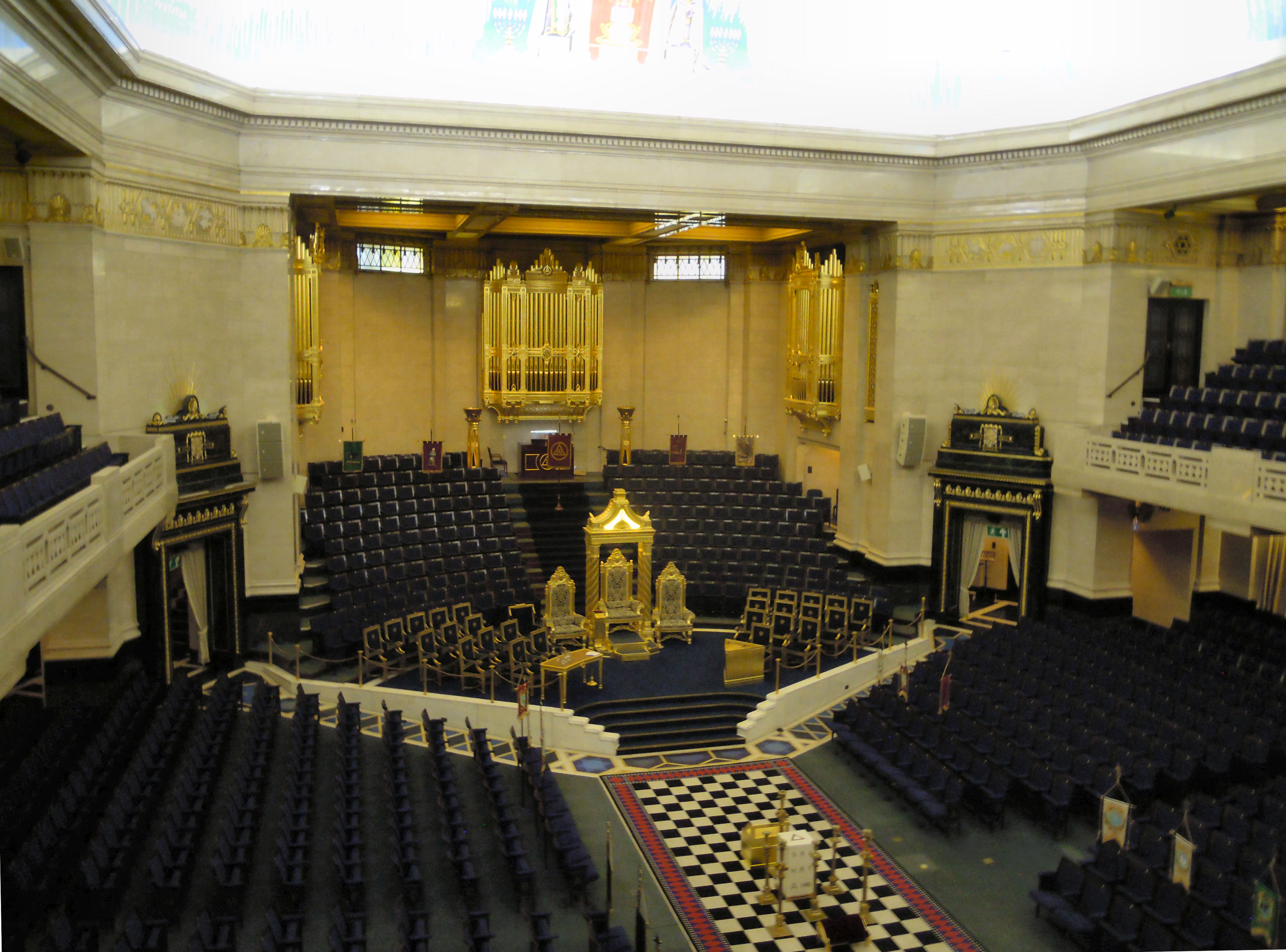
The Grand Temple set up for a meeting

Central to the present building is the Grand Temple, meeting place for Grand Lodge, Grand Chapter and a majority of the lodges in the Metropolitan Grand Lodge of London, as well as the annual meetings of a number of the Home Counties Provincial Grand Lodges, and for other Masonic degrees and orders to hold their annual meetings.

Many non-Masonic organisations also use the Grand Temple for numerous events as diverse as Fashion shows and Polytechnic award ceremonies. Bronze doors, designed by Walter Gilbert each weighing one and a quarter tonnes, open on to a Chamber 123 feet (37 m) long, 90 feet (27 m) wide and 62 feet (19 m) high capable of seating 1,700. As part of the 1993 Covent Garden Festival a performance by British Youth Opera of Mozart's The Magic Flute marked the first time women had been present; the cast included Rosemary Joshua and Elizabeth Vidal and was conducted by Jane Glover.

The ceiling cove is of Mosaic work and in addition to figures and symbols from Masonic ritual includes, in the corner, figures representing the four cardinal virtues – Prudence, Temperance, Fortitude, and Justice – and the Arms of Prince Arthur, Duke of Connaught and Strathearn (second youngest son of Queen Victoria) Grand Master 1901–1939, at whose suggestion the Masonic Peace Memorial was built.

A large pipe organ, built by leading organ builders Henry Willis & Sons, was installed in 1933. Some 80 years later it was restored by Harrison and Harrison of Durham, the work being funded by the Supreme Grand Chapter. The restoration was completed in 2015, and included the provision of a new "Grand" section of the instrument housed in a matching new case immediately behind and above the console, thus creating three structures in place of the original two. The inaugural recital on the restored instrument was given on 30 September 2015 by Dr Thomas Trotter, organist of Birmingham Town Hall and St Margaret's, Westminster.

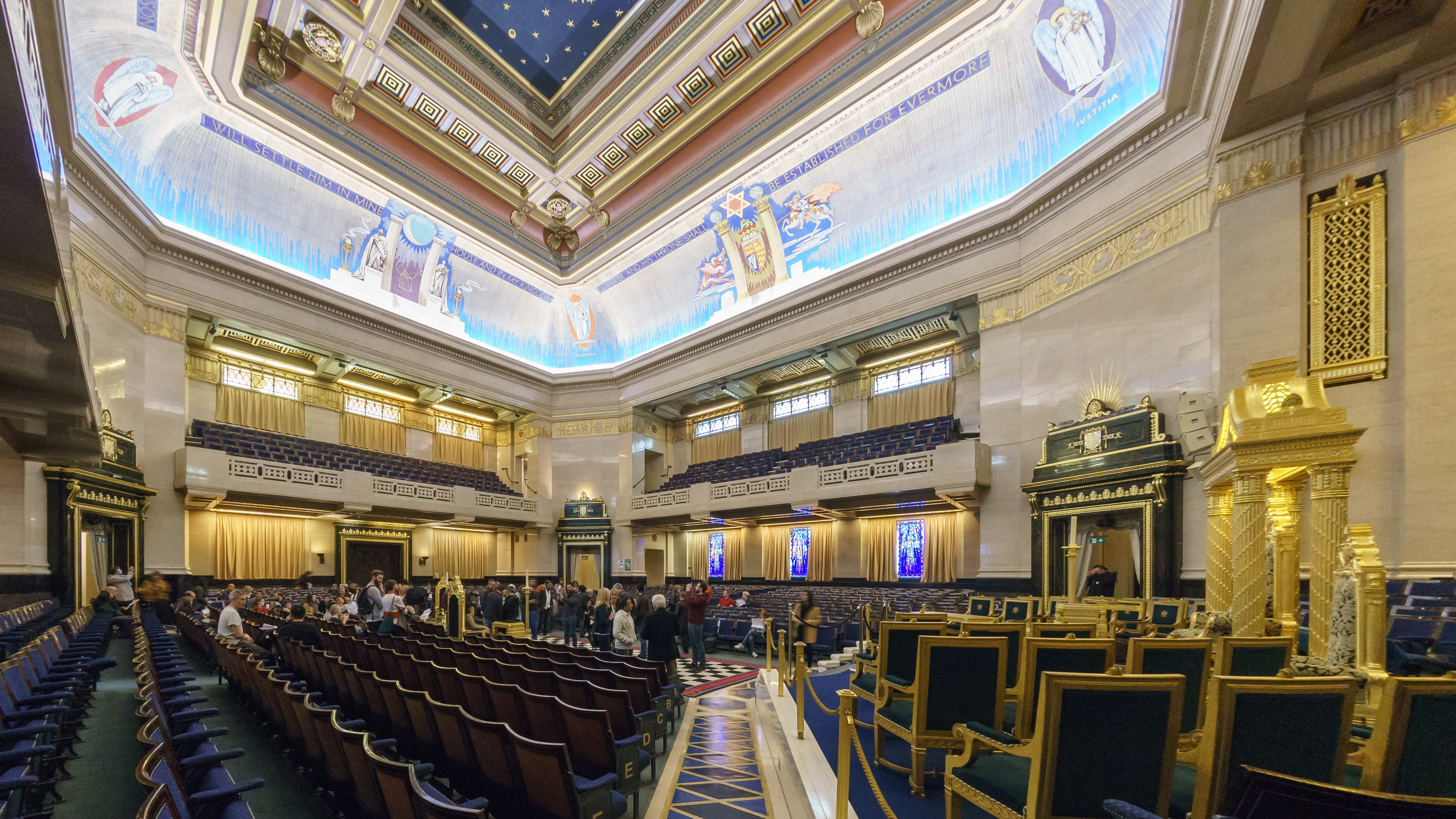
Interior of Grand Temple

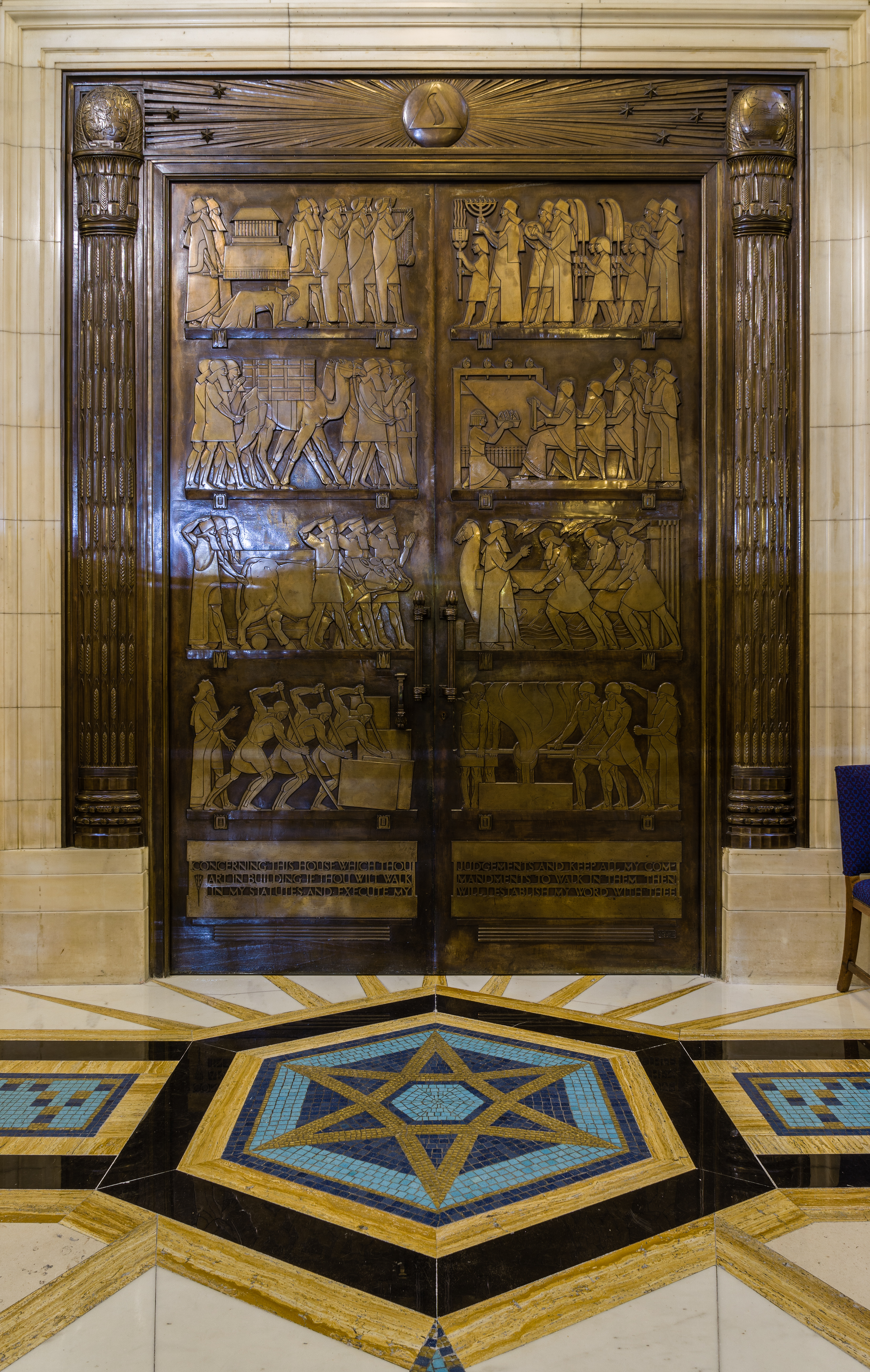
Doors to Grand Temple

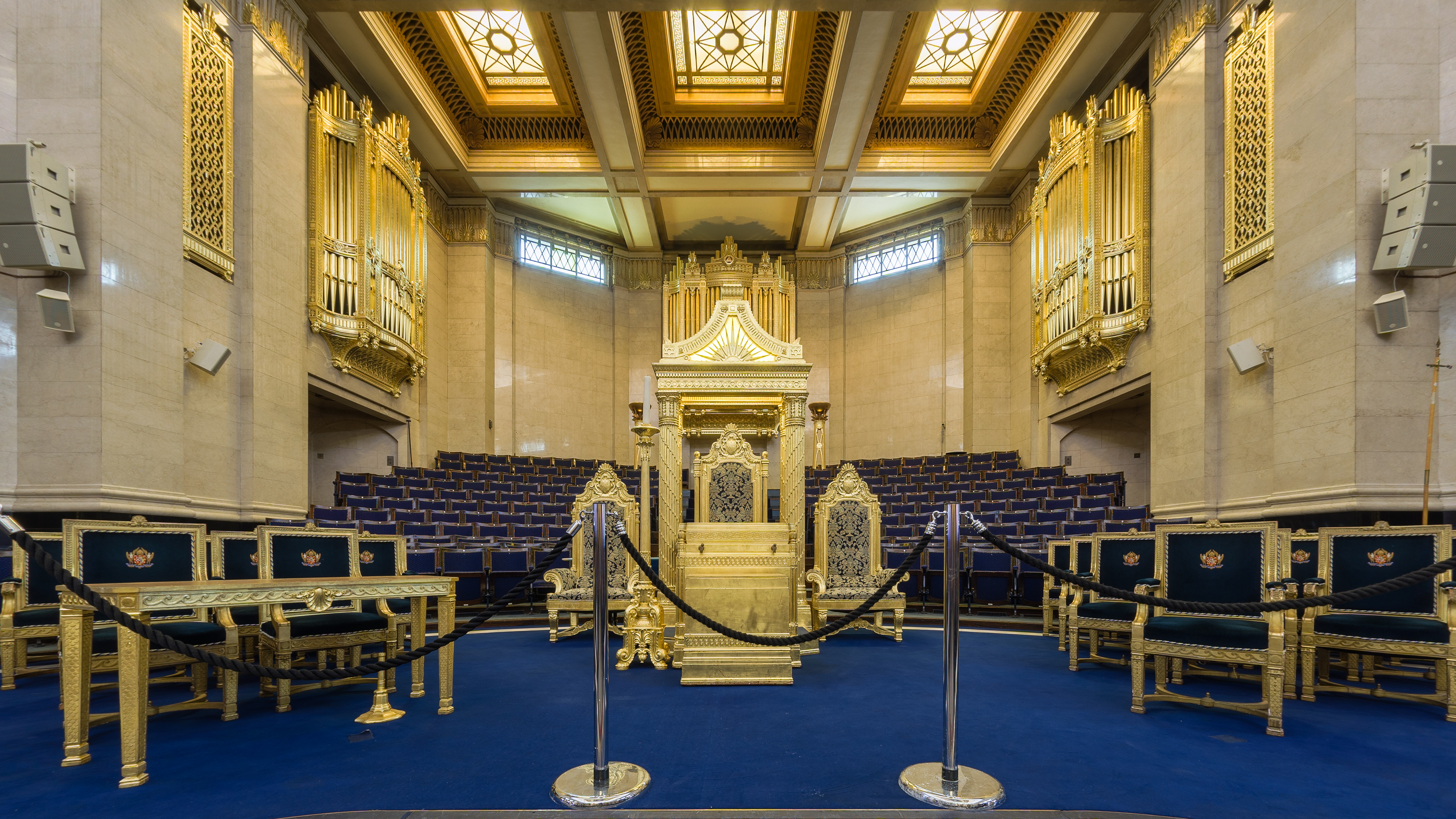
Grand Temple dais, including the pipe organ

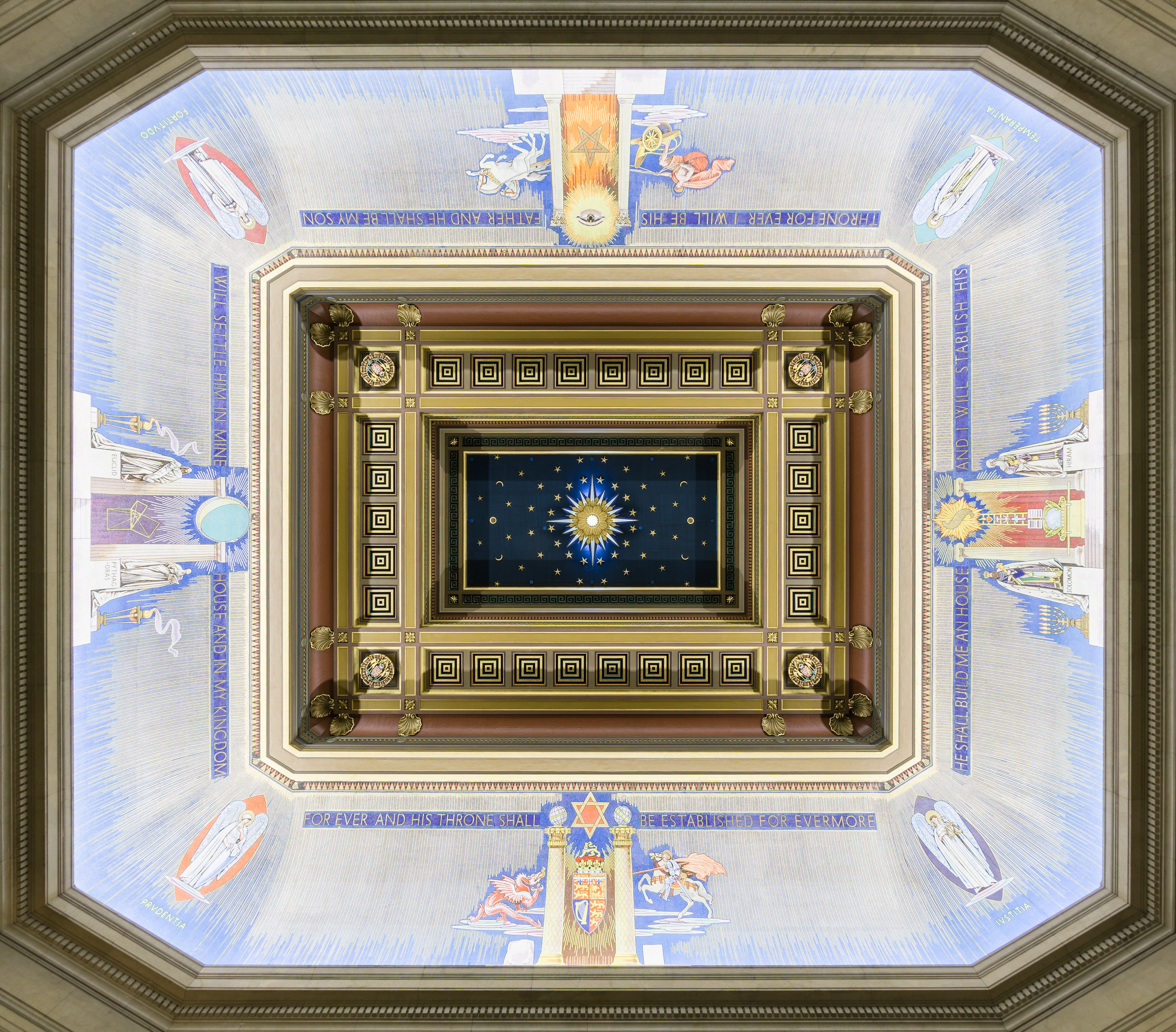
Ceiling

=== Other Temples ===
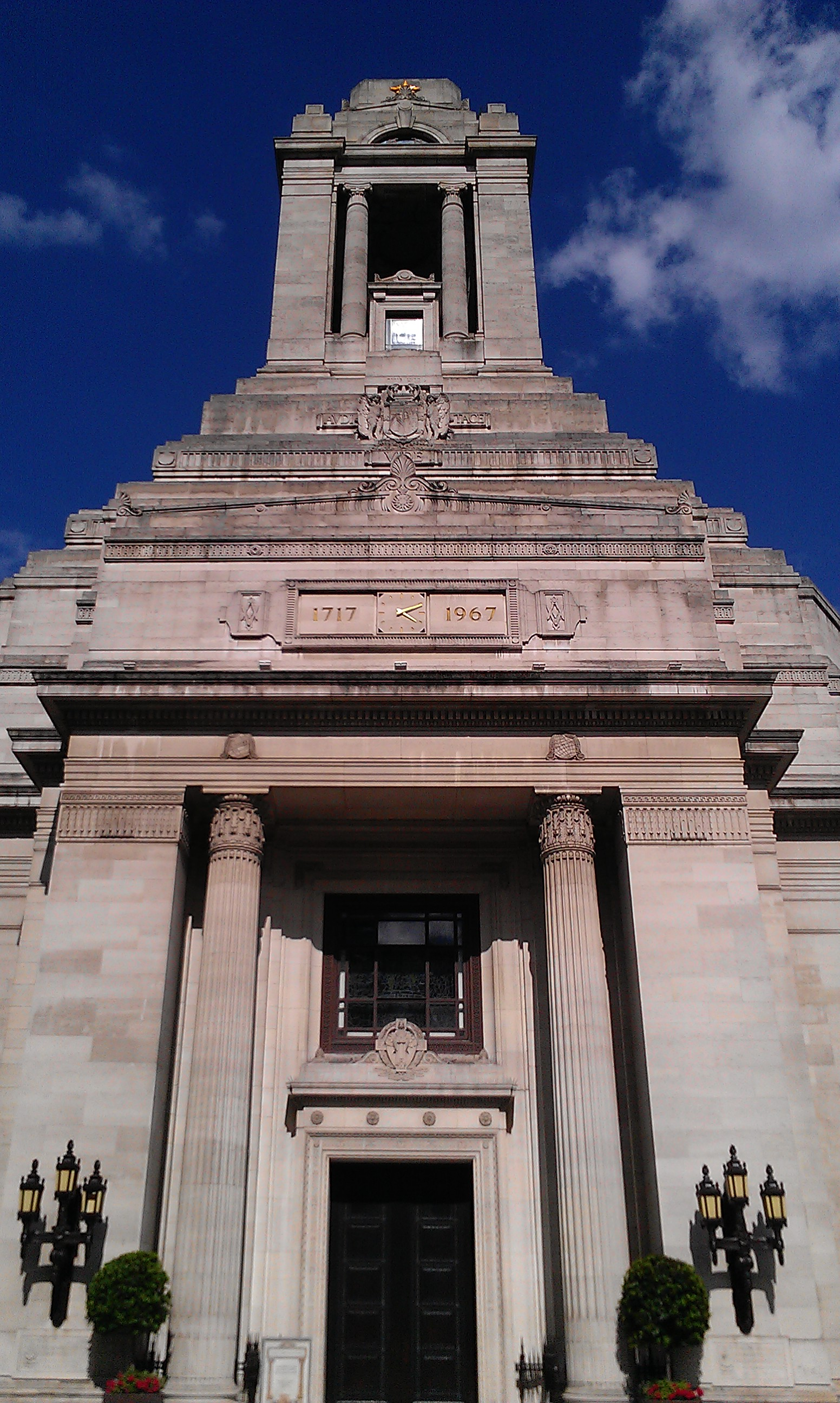
Front exterior of Freemasons' Hall

In addition to the Grand Temple, there are a further 26 masonic temples (formal lodge meeting rooms) within the building, used by Lodges and Chapters. All are highly ornate in their various art deco styles, and no two are identical. Amongst the temples which are of particular note, Temple No 1 was very large (seating up to 600) and contained a series of portraits of former Grand Masters. However, the temple was converted into a conference space, by removing the furnishings and Willis pipe organ (though the portraits remain).

Temple No 3, although of no unusual style in itself, contains a nineteenth-century chamber organ of note (fully restored around 2012); Temple No 10 (where the designers had additional height and space due to its location beneath the large clock tower) is built in a style which combines classic art deco with Egyptian design, and includes an impressive high domed ceiling, and also a Willis pipe organ (awaiting restoration); Temple No 11 was largely funded by donations from Japan and the Far East, and is consequently decorated in a lavish style, dominated by stylised Chrysanthemums, the national flower of Japan; Temple No 12 is known as the Burma Temple for similar reasons, and is decorated with stylised Burmese artwork, and a plaque recording the contributions of Freemasons from British Burma.

Temple No 16 has a distinctive and highly decorated barrel vault ceiling; Temple No 17 was largely funded by the Freemasons of Buckinghamshire, and has a very large carved swan (the symbol of Buckinghamshire) on one wall; it also enjoys a more than usually ornate decorative style, with extensive oak panelling, and is used in particular by the most ancient lodges in London, including the three remaining lodges (of four originals) which pre-date 1717 and the formation of the Grand Lodge itself; until 2018, Temple No 23 was the smallest (seating approximately 35 people) and contained a series of portraits of former Grand Secretaries, but in that year this temple was renamed "The Kent Room" and made available for public examination as part of the Library and Museum of Freemasonry (although it can also still be used for lodge meetings); at the same time, three brand new small temples were created (with a capacity of around 20 people in each), numbered as Temples 25, 26, and 27, as provision for meetings of very small Lodges; these new temples were created out of space that was formerly two residential flats, as the number of residential staff living in the building has greatly reduced.

In addition to these 26 Temples, and the Grand Temple, there are several very simple and plain temples reserved for 'Lodges of Instruction' and 'Lodges of Rehearsal'. Unlike the Grand Temple and the Kent Room (of which public tours are available daily) the other temples (and the rehearsal temples) are not normally open to the public, as they are in constant demand by private London Lodges and Chapters for their regular meetings. Approximately 1800 lodges and chapters meet regularly in London, and a high proportion of these meet at Freemasons' Hall.

=== Museum of Freemasonry ===
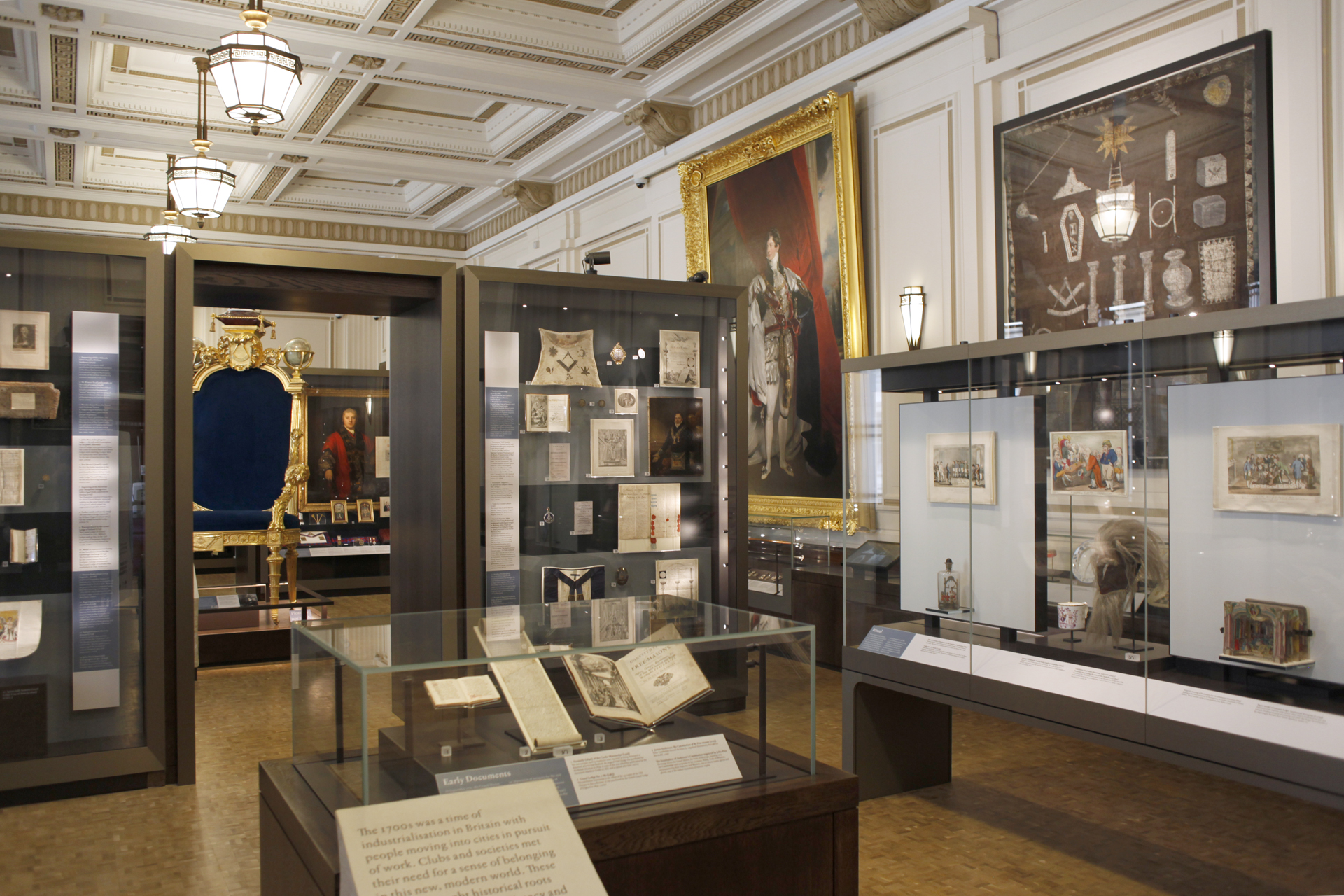
Museum of Freemasonry at Freemasons' Hall

The Museum of Freemasonry is a museum, library and archive based in Freemasons' Hall covering Freemasonry and other fraternal orders. The Museum is a Charitable Trust registered with the Charity Commission (Registered Charity number 1058497).

In 2007 the collection of the Museum of Freemasonry was recognised through the Museums, Libraries and Archives Council’s Designation Scheme as being of outstanding quality and significance and of national and international importance.

The Museum is open to the general public and entry is free of charge. The Museum has a collection of Masonic artworks, ceremonial objects and regalia, as well as everyday objects with Masonic decoration, including clocks, furniture, glassware, jewellery, porcelain, pottery and silver.

The Library is open to the public for reference use and users are required to register. The Library contains a comprehensive collection of printed books and manuscripts on every facet of Freemasonry in England, as well as material on Freemasonry elsewhere in the world, and on subjects associated with Freemasonry or with mystical and esoteric traditions, including the Societas Rosicruciana in Anglia archives. The Library catalogue is available online. In addition to its core Masonic collections, The Museum of Freemasonry holds a wide selection of items relating to Friendly Societies such as the Oddfellows, Foresters and many other societies both current and no longer in existence. A large collection of Friendly Societies books, especially relating to the Oddfellows and the Foresters, are also held by the Library.

The Museum provides a genealogical enquiry service. However, there is no complete alphabetical index of Freemasons publicly available.

The Museum of Freemasonry also presents workshops, events, and a major thematic exhibition, as well as several smaller exhibitions during the course of the year. Admission to all exhibitions is free.

=== Other facilities ===
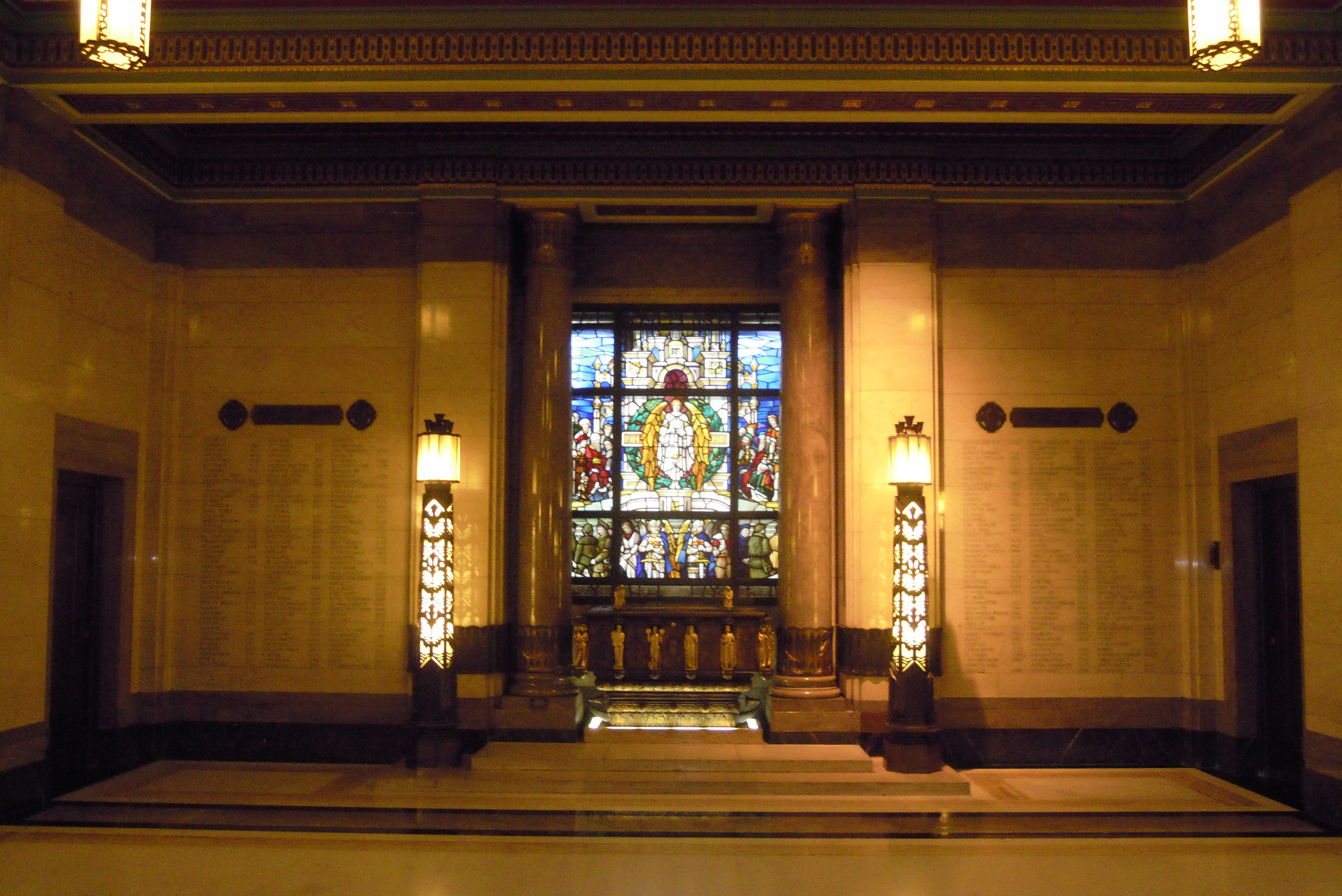
The War Memorial in the Vestibule to the Grand Temple

In addition to the Grand Temple, the other temples, and the Library and Museum, the building contains extensive administrative offices, storage space for the property of the many hundreds of lodges meeting in the building, a masonic shop (open to the public during normal trading hours), board rooms, workshops, archives, a café-bar and an entire floor of charities administration, where the combined masonic charities have their administration.

The Metropolitan Grand Lodge of London is also administered from the building. It has around 40,000 Freemasons as members, which makes it the largest of the Masonic provinces.

=== Architectural fittings ===
Throughout the building Robert Adams (Victor) range of floor springs are used to control the doors, including the "Sceptre Victor." Windows are also controlled by Robert Adams geared fan light operators.

== In popular culture ==
In 2016, a part of the film Assassin's Creed was filmed in the Grand Temple. Re-labeled as "The Grand Templar Hall", the Temple is used as the antagonist's location for his award ceremony towards the end of the film. The Hall is seen sporting double Templar Crosses on the facade of the Temple.

Like Sandby's Grand Hall, the Grand Temple is also used for concerts and musical events – having excellent acoustics and clear sight-lines. In September 2014, Freemasons' Hall hosted several fashion shows as a part of London Fashion Week 2014.

The building is used both internally and externally as a stand-in for Thames House (the home of MI5) in the TV series Spooks and in the TV series Spy and has also featured extensively in the long-running series of TV films Agatha Christie's Poirot. The building makes frequent one-off appearances in episodes of other television series, such as its extensive use in Hustle, series 5, episode 2. Both its exterior and interior were used in an episode of New Tricks, and the interior has been used for the film adaptation of The Hitchhiker's Guide to the Galaxy where Freemasons' Hall becomes the temple in which the "Jatravartid" people pray for "the coming of the Great White Handkerchief". It has also been used in many other feature films, including Agent Cody Banks 2: Destination London, The Wings of the Dove, Johnny English, Sherlock Holmes, and the television adaptation of The Line of Beauty. The building has also featured as a backdrop in music videos, including extensive use (internally and externally) in the music video for Westlife's cover of Mandy. It featured as the Illuminati Headquarters in the 2022 MCU film Doctor Strange in the Multiverse of Madness.

The 2013 crypto-thriller The Sword of Moses by Dominic Selwood has numerous scenes set in Freemasons' Hall.

In 2022 The Late Late Show with James Corden filmed four episodes in Freemasons' Hall for a London week.

== See also ==
- Freemasonry
- Mark Masons' Hall, London
- List of Masonic libraries
