= Montsaunès =

- Commune
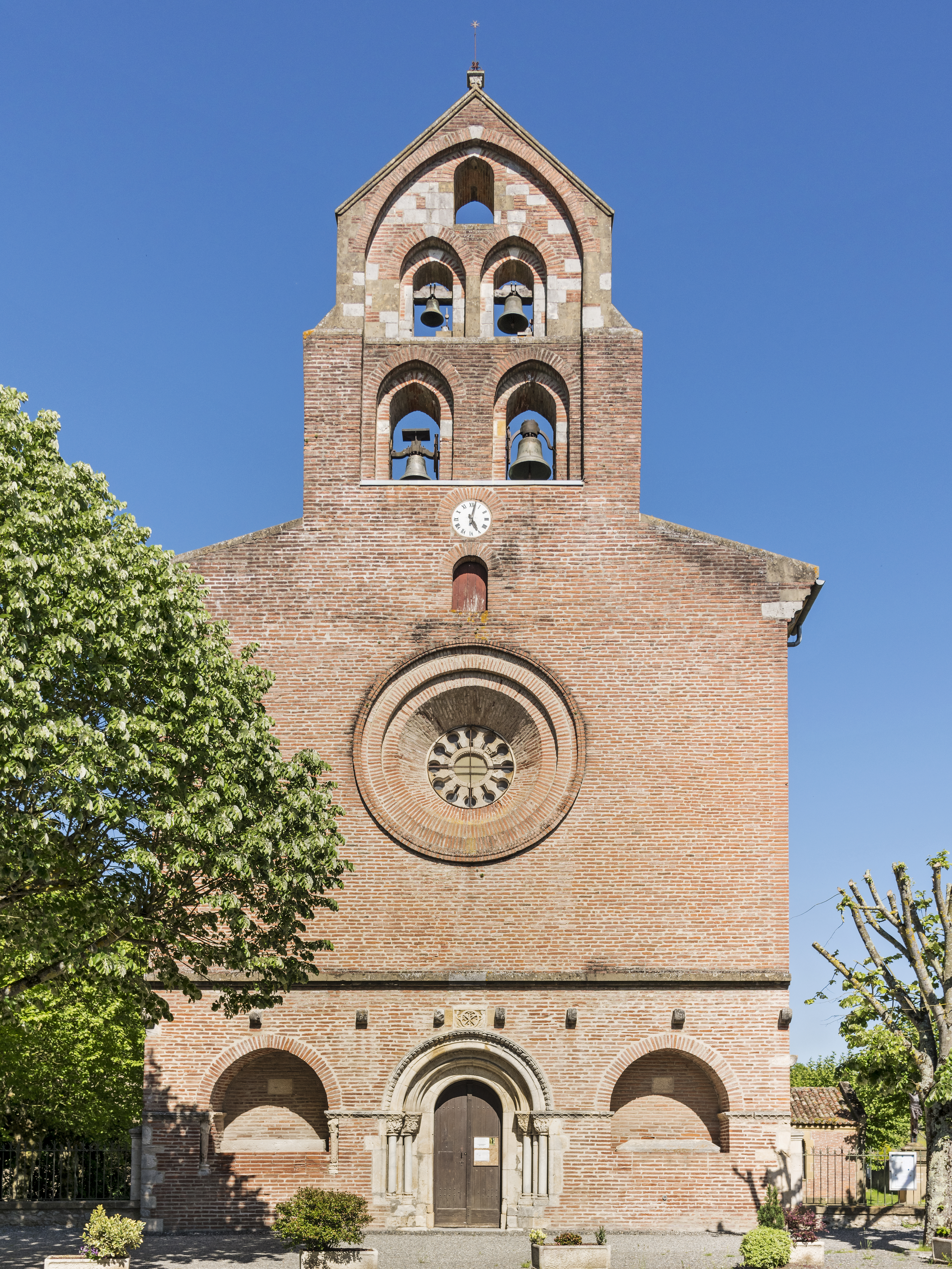
- The church in Montsaunès

- Coat of arms
- Location of Montsaunès
- Location within France Location within Occitanie
- Coordinates: 43°06′44″N 0°56′15″E
- Country: France
- Region: Occitania
- Department: Haute-Garonne
- Arrondissement: Saint-Gaudens
- Canton: Bagnères-de-Luchon

Government
  - Mayor (2020–2026): Maryse Mourlan
- Area^{1}: 9.12 km^{2} (3.52 sq mi)
- Elevation: 325 m (1,066 ft)
- Highest elevation: 411 m (1,348 ft)
- Lowest elevation: 285 m (935 ft)
- Population (2023): 455
  - Density: 49.9/km^{2} (129/sq mi)
- Time zone: UTC+01:00 (CET)
  - Summer (DST): UTC+02:00 (CEST)
- INSEE/Postal code: 31391 /31260
- ^{1} French Land Register data, which excludes lakes, ponds, glaciers > 1 km^{2} (0.386 sq mi or 247 acres) and river estuaries.

Montsaunès (French pronunciation: [mɔ̃sonɛs]; Occitan: Montsaunèrs) is a commune in the Haute-Garonne department of southwestern France.

== Population ==
Historical population
| Year | Pop. | ±% p.a. |
|---|---|---|
| 1968 | 371 | — |
| 1975 | 385 | +0.53% |
| 1982 | 402 | +0.62% |
| 1990 | 362 | −1.30% |
| 1999 | 379 | +0.51% |
| 2007 | 400 | +0.68% |
| 2012 | 430 | +1.46% |
| 2017 | 445 | +0.69% |
| 2023 | 455 | +0.37% |
Source: INSEE

== In popular culture ==
The Templar chapel of St Christophe features in the 2013 crypto-thriller The Sword of Moses by Dominic Selwood.

== See also ==
- Communes of the Haute-Garonne department
