= Museum Mile =

Museum Mile commonly refers to Museum Mile, a mile-long stretch on Fifth Avenue in Manhattan, New York City, where major museums are located.

It may also refer to:

- Museum Mile, London, collective name for museums in the area between King's Cross and the River Thames
- Museum Mile (horse), a Japanese racehorse
