= Battle of St. Hilarion Castle =

Battle in Cyprus

- Part of Cyprus intercommunal violence
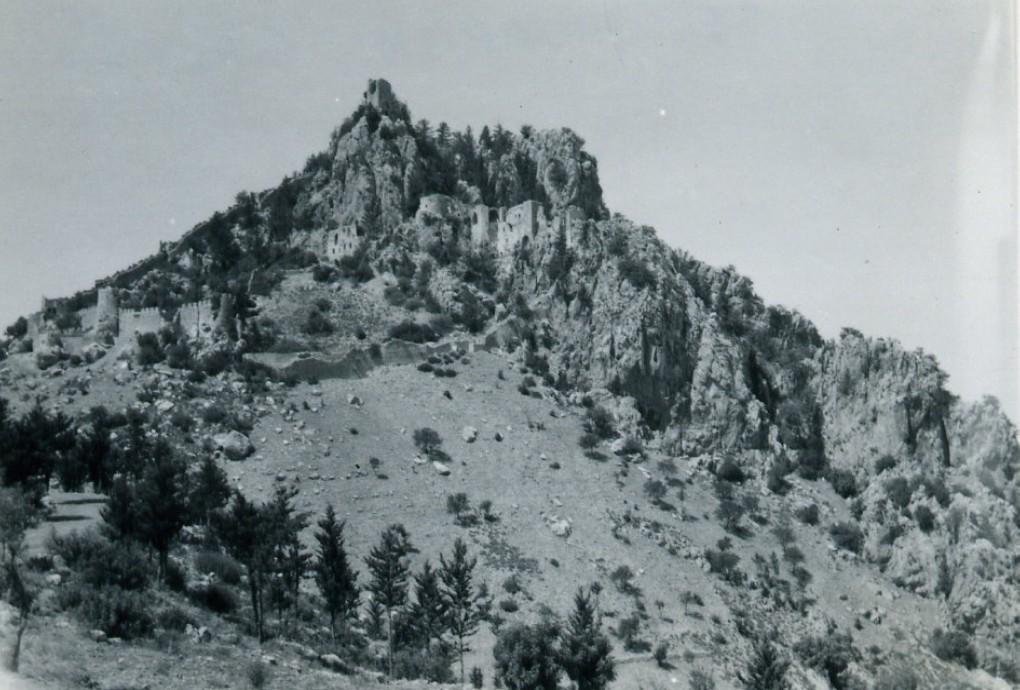
- St. Hilarion Castle, circa 1952
Date	April 25 – 27, 1964
Location	St. Hilarion Castle, Kyrenia Mountains, Cyprus
Result	Greek-Cypriot victory
Territorial changes	Hill is retaken by forces loyal to the government of Cyprus

Belligerents
Greek Cypriot volunteers	TMT; Supported by: Turkey

Commanders and leaders
Major Dimitrios Poulos Doros Ilias	Unknown

Strength
150 approx.	100–150

Casualties and losses
15–20 killed 35–40 wounded	20 killed Unknown injured 4 Turkish Cypriots turned over to Cyprus Police

The Battle of St. Hilarion Castle was an early military engagement fought between April 25 and April 27, 1964, during the Cyprus intercommunal violence. The battle centered on a medieval, Crusader-era fortress positioned high up in the Kyrenia Mountain range. Irregular militias launched a massive, multi-directional infantry assault to seize the high ground from fortified members of the Turkish Resistance Organization (TMT) local volunteers.

== Background ==
Following the outbreak of widespread intercommunal violence in December 1963, the demographic layout of Cyprus fragmented into fortified, ethnically based enclaves. The landlocked Turkish Cypriot population in Nicosia relied heavily on keeping the main transport route northward to the Kyrenia coast open for potential logistical support and communications with mainland Turkey. St. Hilarion Castle, a 10th-century Byzantine and Crusader fortress situated 2,400 feet (730 m) above sea level, occupied the dominant terrain directly overlooking this vital mountain pass. In early 1964, a garrison of roughly 100 to 150 local TMT combatants, youth activists, and Turkish Cypriot volunteers fortified themselves within the ruins. Because the garrison could act as a staging platform for snipers and checkpoint blockades, the Greek Cypriot leadership resolved to neutralize the position.

Declassified United States Department of State intelligence noted that the Greek Cypriot assault was a systematic operation designed to test the operational limits and boundaries of the newly deployed United Nations Peacekeeping Force in Cyprus.

== Battle ==
=== 25–26 April ===
In the predawn hours of April 25, 1964, elements of the Kokkinoskoufides (Greek Cypriot irregular units), launched a surprise offensive. Utilizing the cover of darkness to navigate the treacherous, jagged cliffs leading toward the castle's outer walls, the attacking force sought to overwhelm the defensive perimeter before daybreak. Equipped with light infantry weapons and mortars, the initial waves managed to push up the southern slopes, overrunning several exposed Turkish Cypriot outposts and lower observation ridges under heavy skirmishing.

=== 27 April ===
The decision was made by the government of Cyprus not to fully pursue into the Kyrenia mountains.

Concurrently, the Republic of Turkey massed military forces on its southern coast and threatened direct military intervention if the enclave was overrun. On April 27, Greek Cypriot forces officially called a halt further attacks in the Kyrenia pass after their objectives were achieved.

== Aftermath ==
=== Greek and Greek Cypriot Losses ===
The attacking forces suffered heavily during the uphill charges. Historical estimates place losses at 15 to 20 combatants killed in action and an estimated 35 to 40 wounded.

=== Turkish Cypriot Losses ===
The TMT forces suffered multiple casualties, approximately 20 killed in action, unknown number of injuries and 4 Turkish Cypriots were turned over to Cyprus Police. This strategic positioning effectively kept the Nicosia–Kyrenia corridor contested.
