= Anatomy of a Nation: A History of British Identity in 50 Documents =

History book

- Author: Dominic Selwood
- Genre: History, British History
- Published: 23 September 2021 Constable (Hachette)
- Publication place: England
- ISBN: 9781472131898
- Dewey Decimal: 941

Anatomy of a Nation: A History of British Identity in 50 Documents is a 2021 history book by the English historian and barrister Dominic Selwood.

It explores over 900,000 years of British identity by examining 50 documents that tell the story of what makes Britain unique: its evolution, achievements, complexities, and tensions.

== Thesis ==
The book presents Britain's identity as ever-changing. The first humans to find Britain were nomadic hunters, who were followed by more sedentary farmers. A Celtic identity emerged in the late Bronze Age, before giving way to Romano-British culture. Bands of Anglo-Saxons arrived on the withdrawal of Roman power, bringing Germanic culture, which was added to by Viking settlement and conquest, bringing parts of Britain into a wider Anglo-Scandinavian world. Then, in 1066, the Normans arrived, starting several centuries of connection between Britain and France. In later centuries, Africans, Roma, Indians and others arrived, before significant immigration in the mid-twentieth century from the British Empire and former British Empire. Finally, Britain's membership of the European Union brought freedom of movement for EU citizens until Britain left the EU in January 2020 after the 2016 Brexit referendum.

Selwood's thesis is that Britain has had many identities, each of which has been successful in different ways. The challenge for the country is to stop relying on imperial figures like Winston Churchill as the epitome of Britishness, and try to find a new identity for the twenty-first century. To do this, Selwood urges a critical examination of Britain's long history to understand the range of identities Britain has had, and the need to find inspiration in them for a new, modern identity.

== Critical reception ==
BBC Radio called it "a fantastic book". James Sewry in The Times Literary Supplement noted the book's "range and rich diversity of material" and commended the choice of 50 documents in which "the predictable is far outweighed by the surprising and off-beat … a readable and enjoyable narrative history". The Times called it "An incredible insight into the private lives of people’. The Law Society Gazette said "An absorbing read. One of the joys of Selwood's writing is his cogent analysis. The exhaustive bibliography of sources attests to the depth of Selwood's research. An innovative history eruditely told". Soldier Magazine (the official magazine of the British Army) noted that it is "stimulating ... ambitious ... wide and varied ... clear and lively ... sections on Northern Ireland and the Falklands War are judicious, balanced and well-argued".
