= Saint Hilarion Castle =

Castle in Cyprus

- (Greek: Κάστρο του Αγίου Ιλαρίωνα) (Turkish: Saint Hilarion Kalesi)
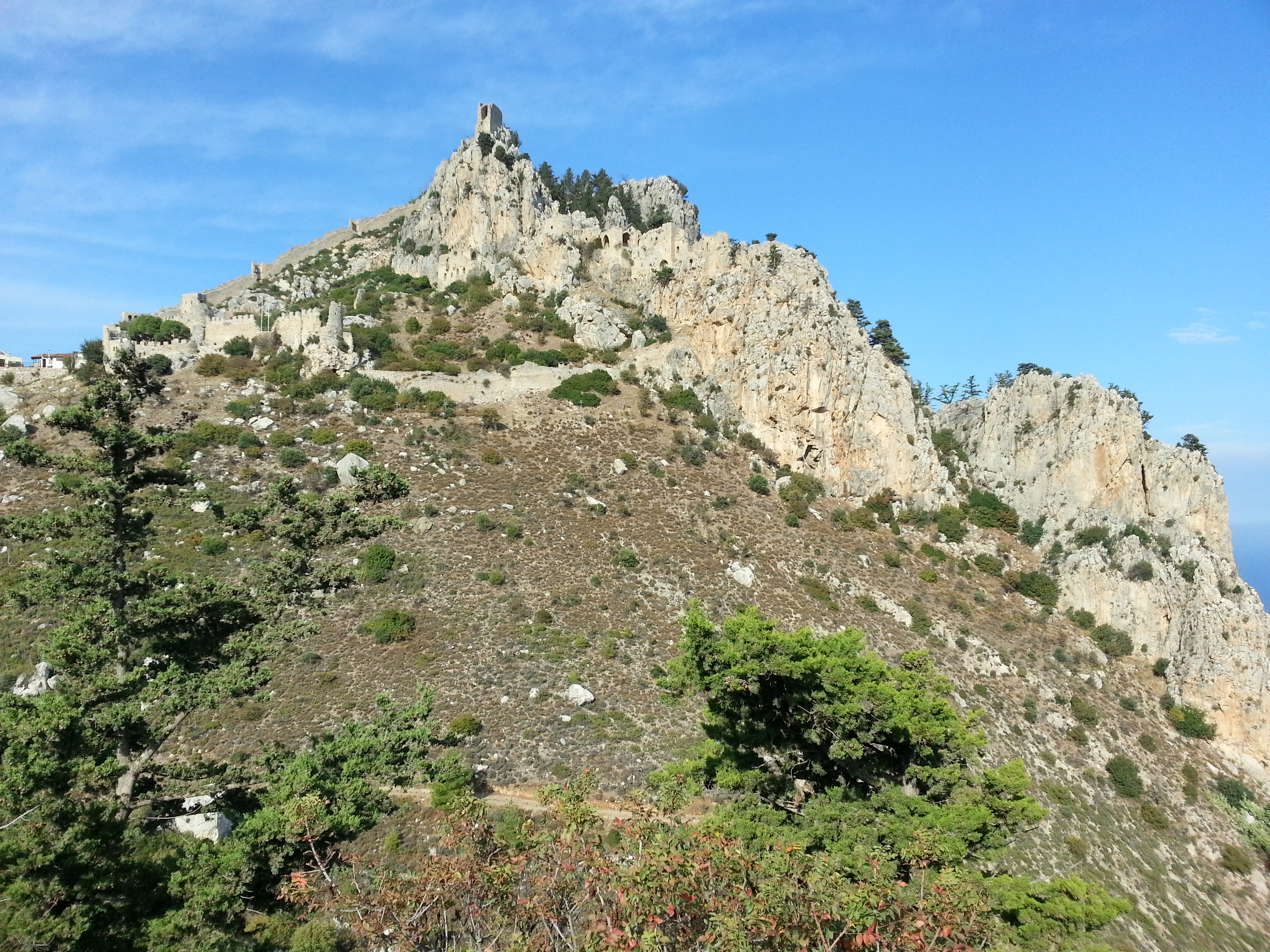
- Saint Hilarion Castle

- Location within Cyprus

General information
- Location: Kyrenia, De jure Cyprus; De facto Northern Cyprus
- Coordinates: 35.3123°N 33.2808°E
- Construction started: 10th-century

Website
- https://www.sthilarion.org/

Saint Hilarion Castle is in the Kyrenia Mountains of Cyprus. This location provided the castle with command of the pass road from Kyrenia to Nicosia. It is the best preserved ruin of the three former strongholds in the Kyrenia mountains, the other two being Kantara and Buffavento.

== History ==
The castle is not named after Saint Hilarion of Thavata. It was named after an obscure saint, who is traditionally held to have fled to Cyprus after the Arab conquest of the Holy Land and retired to the hilltop on which the castle was built for hermitage. An English traveller reported the preservation of his relics in the 14th century. It has been proposed that a monastery built in his name preceded the castle, which was built around it. However, this view is not supported by any substantial evidence.

Starting in the 11th century, the Byzantines began fortification. Saint Hilarion, together with the castles of Buffavento and Kantara, formed the defense of the island against Arab raids against the coast. Some sections were further upgraded under the Lusignan dynasty, whose kings may have used it as a summer residence. During the rule of the Lusignans, the castle was the focus of a four-year struggle between Holy Roman Emperor Frederick II and Regent John of Ibelin (c. 1179 – 1236) for control over Cyprus.

Much of the castle was dismantled by the Venetians in the 15th century to reduce the cost of garrisons.

== Architecture ==
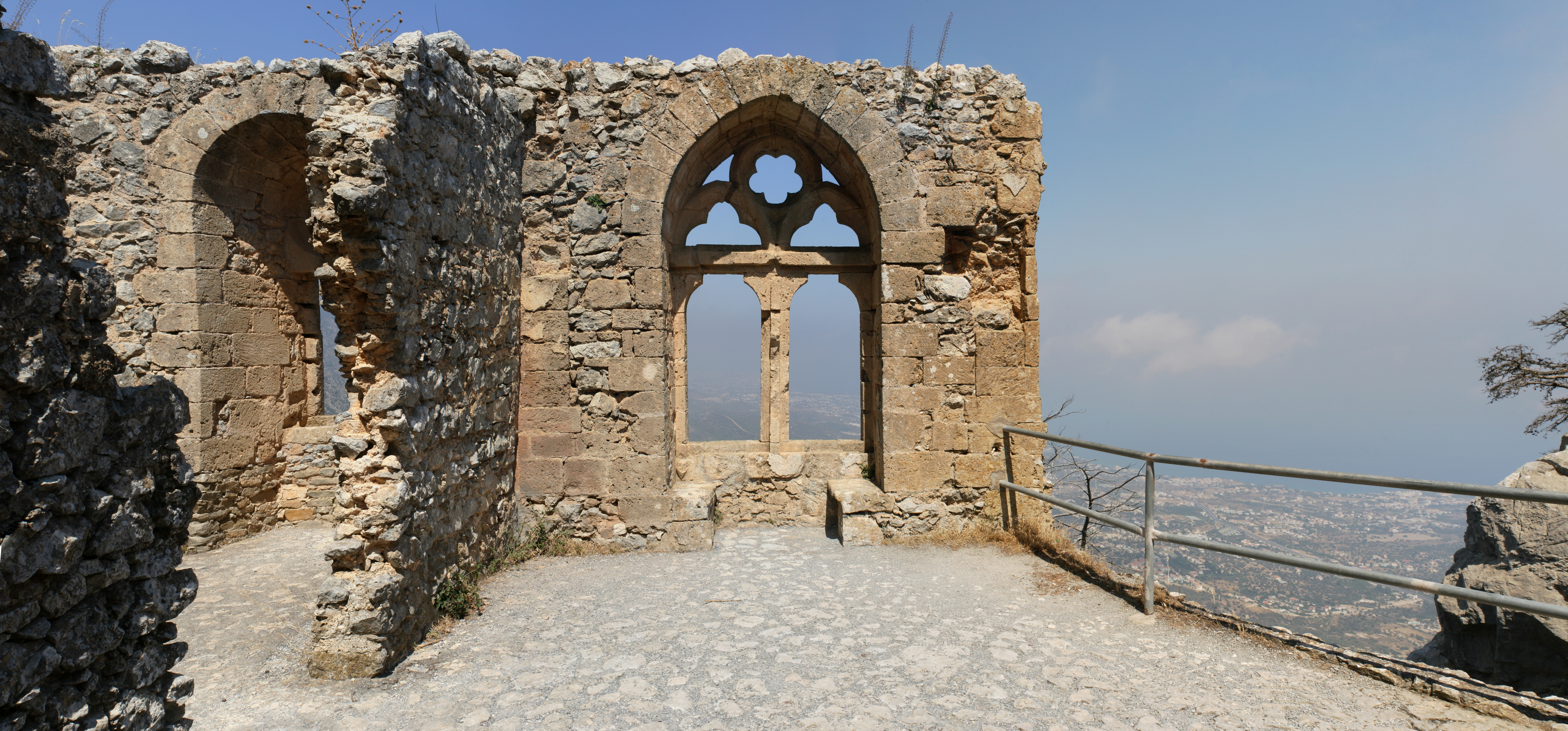
View of the Queen's window (Queen Eleanor) in the upper ward.

The castle has three divisions or wards. The lower and middle wards served economic purposes, while the upper ward housed the royal family. The lower ward had the stables and the living quarters for the men-at-arms. The Prince John tower sits on a cliff high above the lower castle.

The upper ward was surrounded by a 1.4 metres (4.6 ft) thick Byzantine wall, made of rough masonry. The entrance is through a pointed arch built by the Lusignans. This was protected by a semicircular tower to the east. Within the ward is a courtyard, with twin peaks being situated to either side of it. To the north-east is an extremely ruined kitchen. To the west are the royal apartments, dated by various sources to the 13th or 14th centuries. Although mostly ruined today, this was a structure in the northeast-southwest axis, with a length of 25 m (82 ft) and width of 6 m (20 ft). It has a basement containing a cistern and two floors. The ground floor has a height of 7 m (23 ft) and a pointed barrel vault. The upper floor is known for its carved windows, one of which is dubbed the Queen's Window. These are placed on the western wall, which has a scenic view of the northern coast of Cyprus, especially the plains of Lapithos.

== In fiction ==
Two of the main characters in the 1958 historical novel, Exodus, by Leon Uris, spend a day walking around the castle ruins. It is featured in the 1999 novel Race of Scorpions by Dorothy Dunnett. It also appears in the 2009 action-adventure video game Assassin's Creed: Bloodlines, and Death in Cyprus by M. M. Kaye. The castle is also featured in the 2016 crypto-thriller The Apocalypse Fire by Dominic Selwood.

== Gallery ==
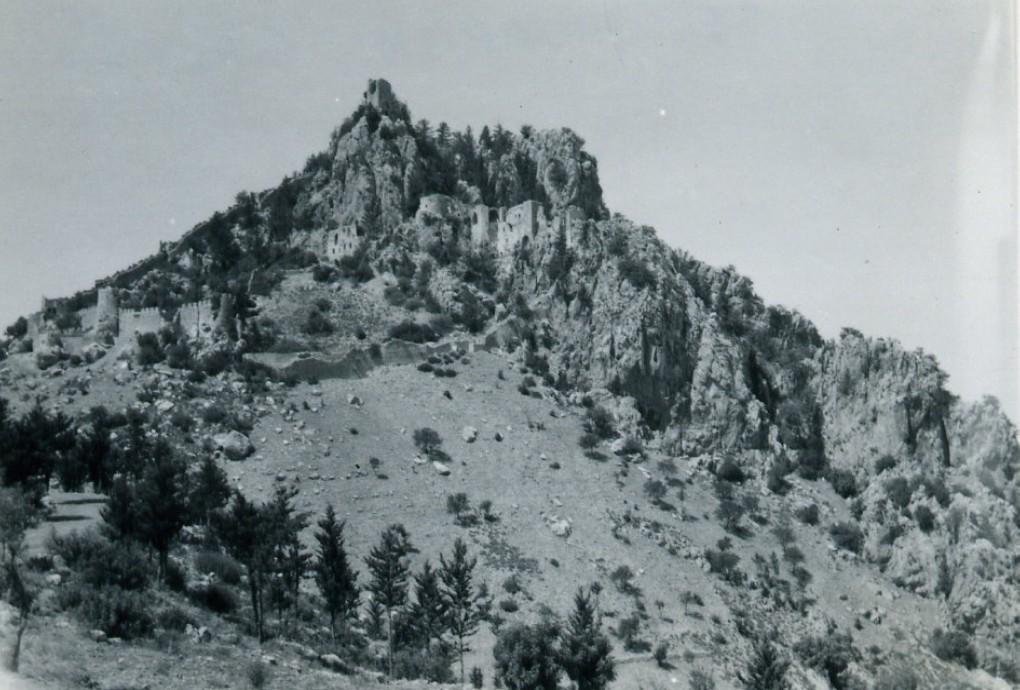
Saint Hilarion Castle, Cyprus

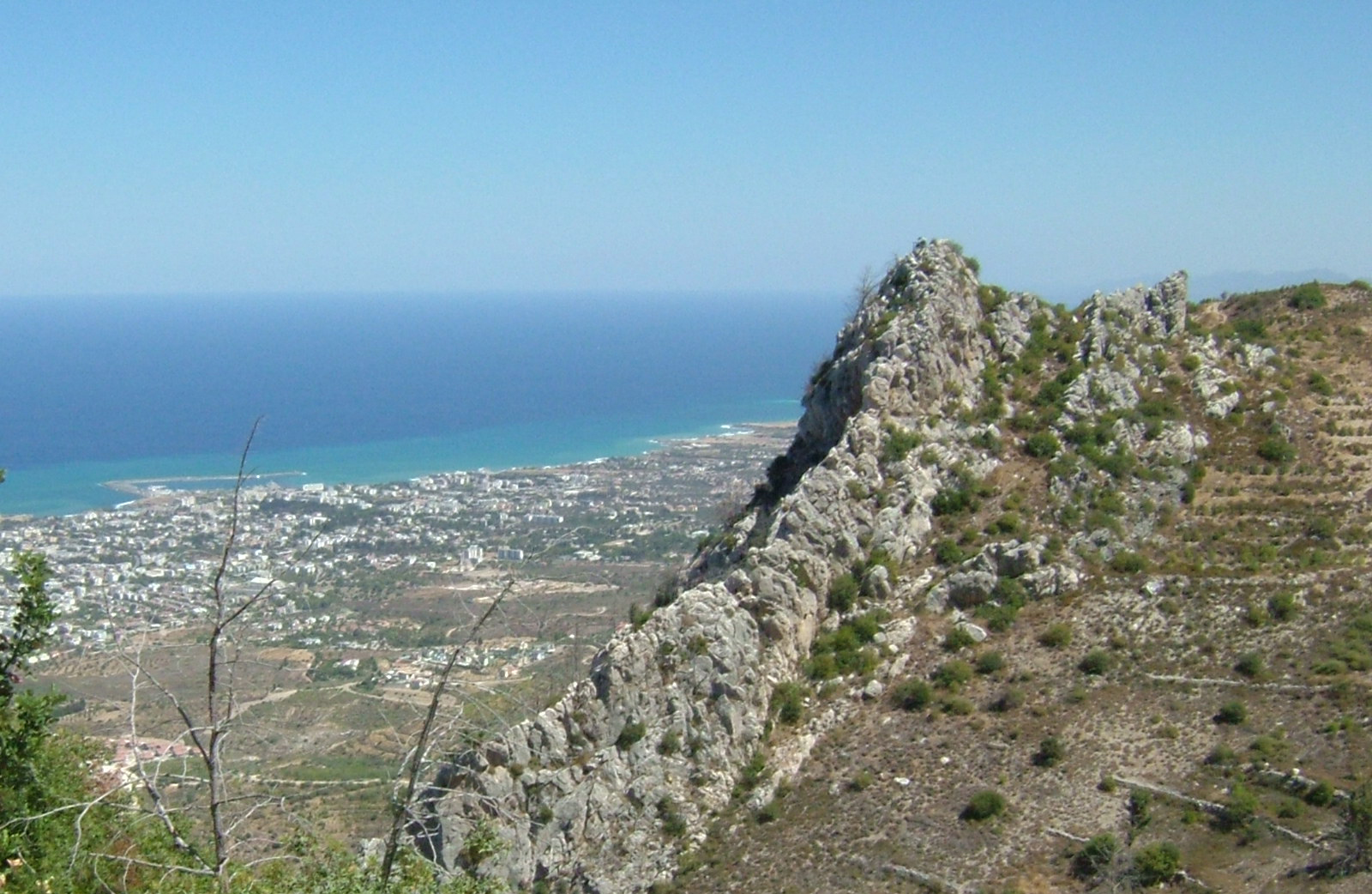

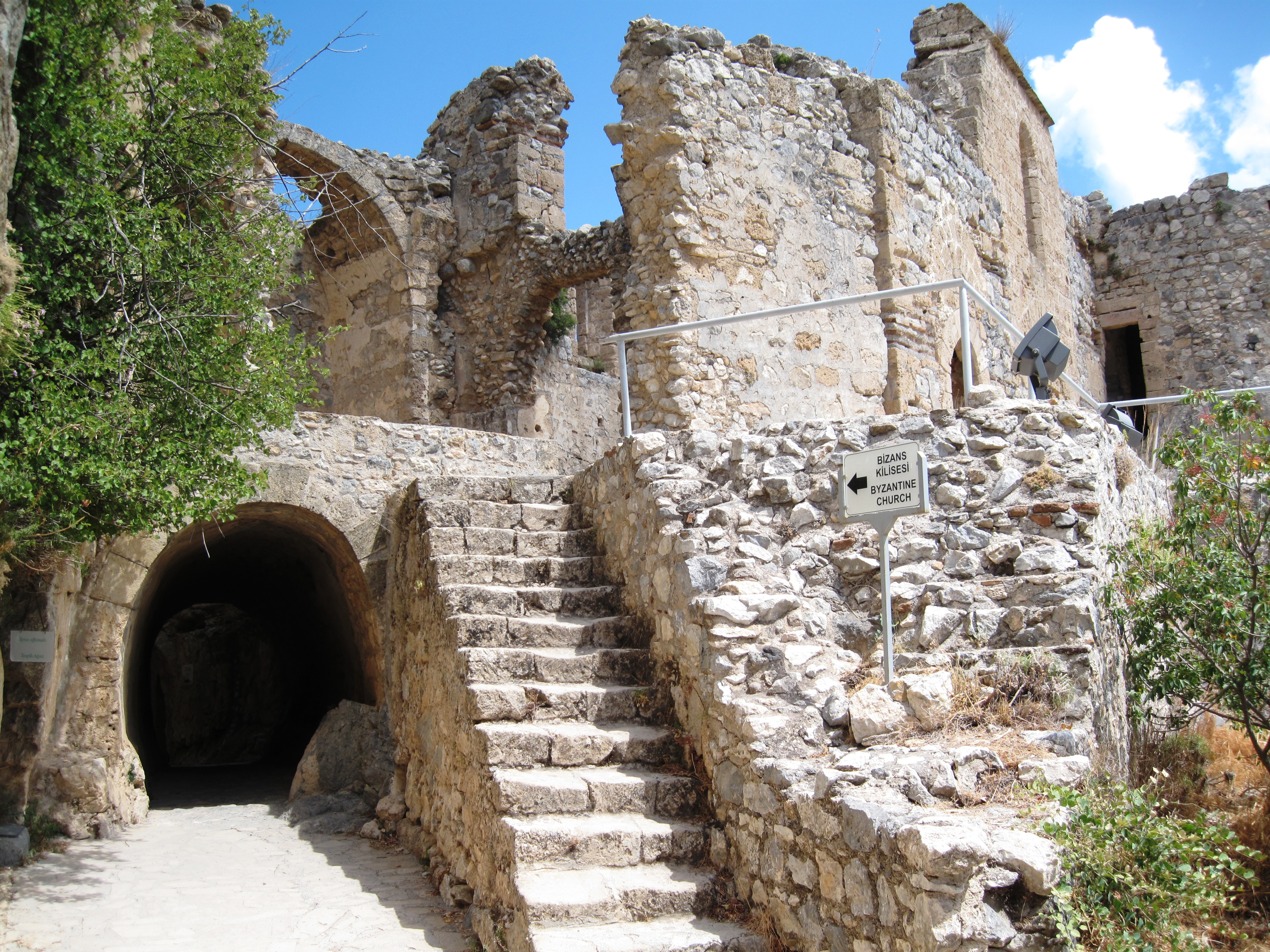

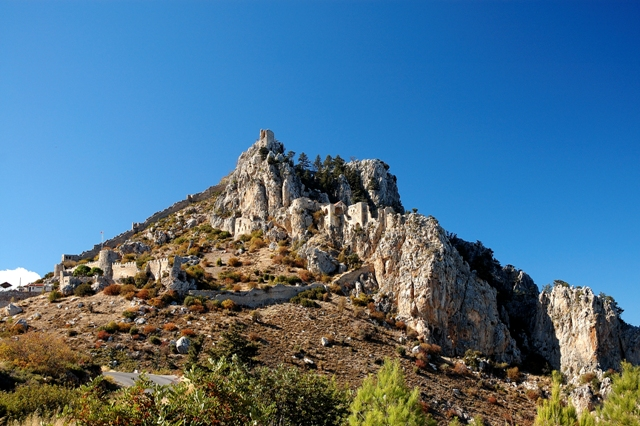
Saint Hilarion Castle

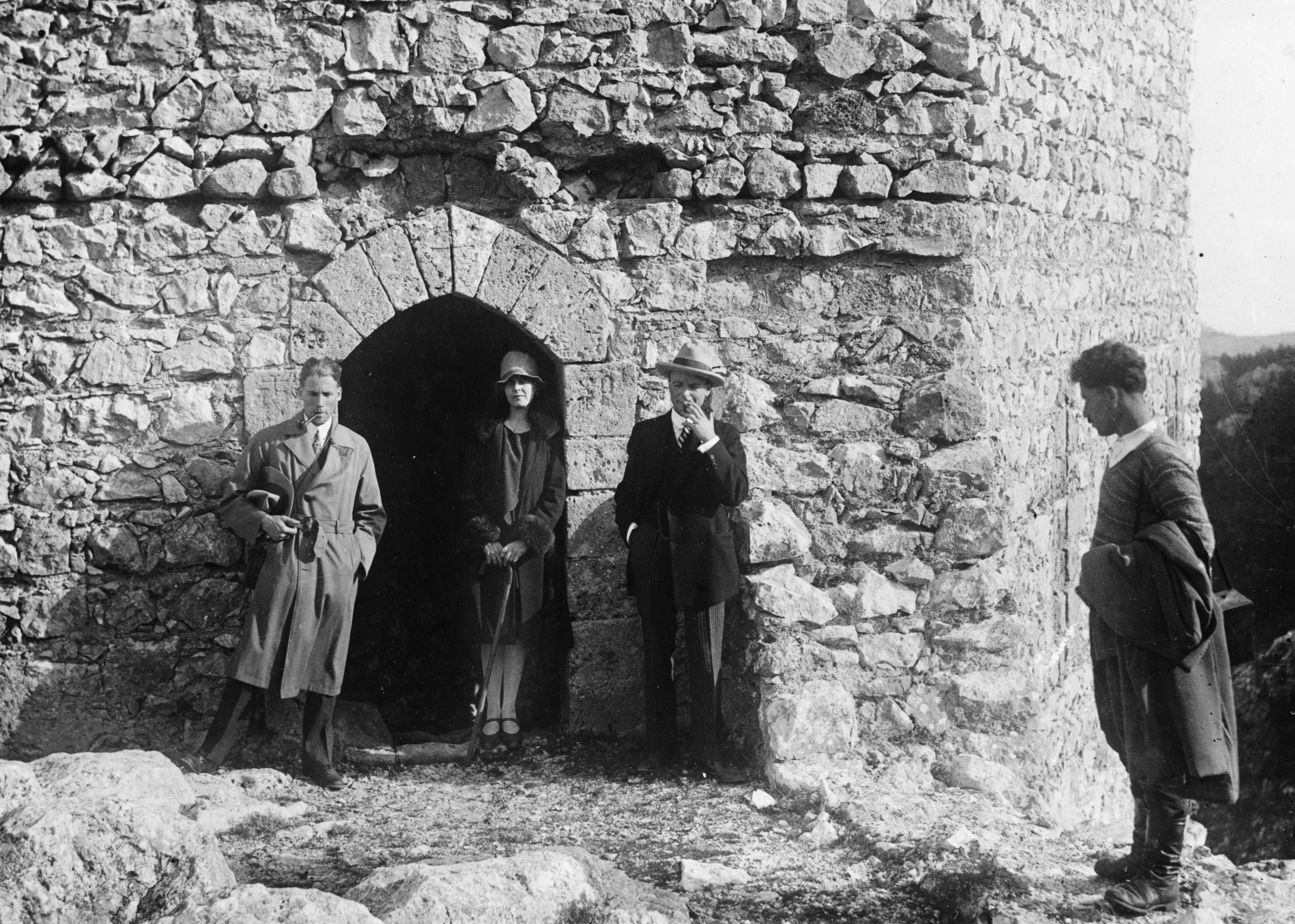
Swedish Cyprus Expedition on a visit to Saint Hilarion sometime in 1927–1931.

== See also ==
- List of Crusader castles
