= TNF (disambiguation) =

TNF (tumor necrosis factor) is a cell signaling protein (cytokine) involved in systemic inflammation.

TNF may also refer to:

- Talking News Federation, UK charitable organization (see Talking Newspaper Association of the United Kingdom)
- The NetBSD Foundation, US not-for-profit corporation that owns the intellectual property and trademarks associated with the NetBSD operating system
- The North Face, US outdoor products manufacturer
- Third normal form, in database normalization
- Thursday Night Football, NFL weekly sports broadcast
- Tumor necrosis factor superfamily, a protein superfamily
- Tonfanau railway station, Gwynedd, Wales (National Rail station code)
- Toussus-le-Noble Airport
