= Museum of Freemasonry =

Museum in London, England

Coordinates: 51°30′54″N 0°07′16″W

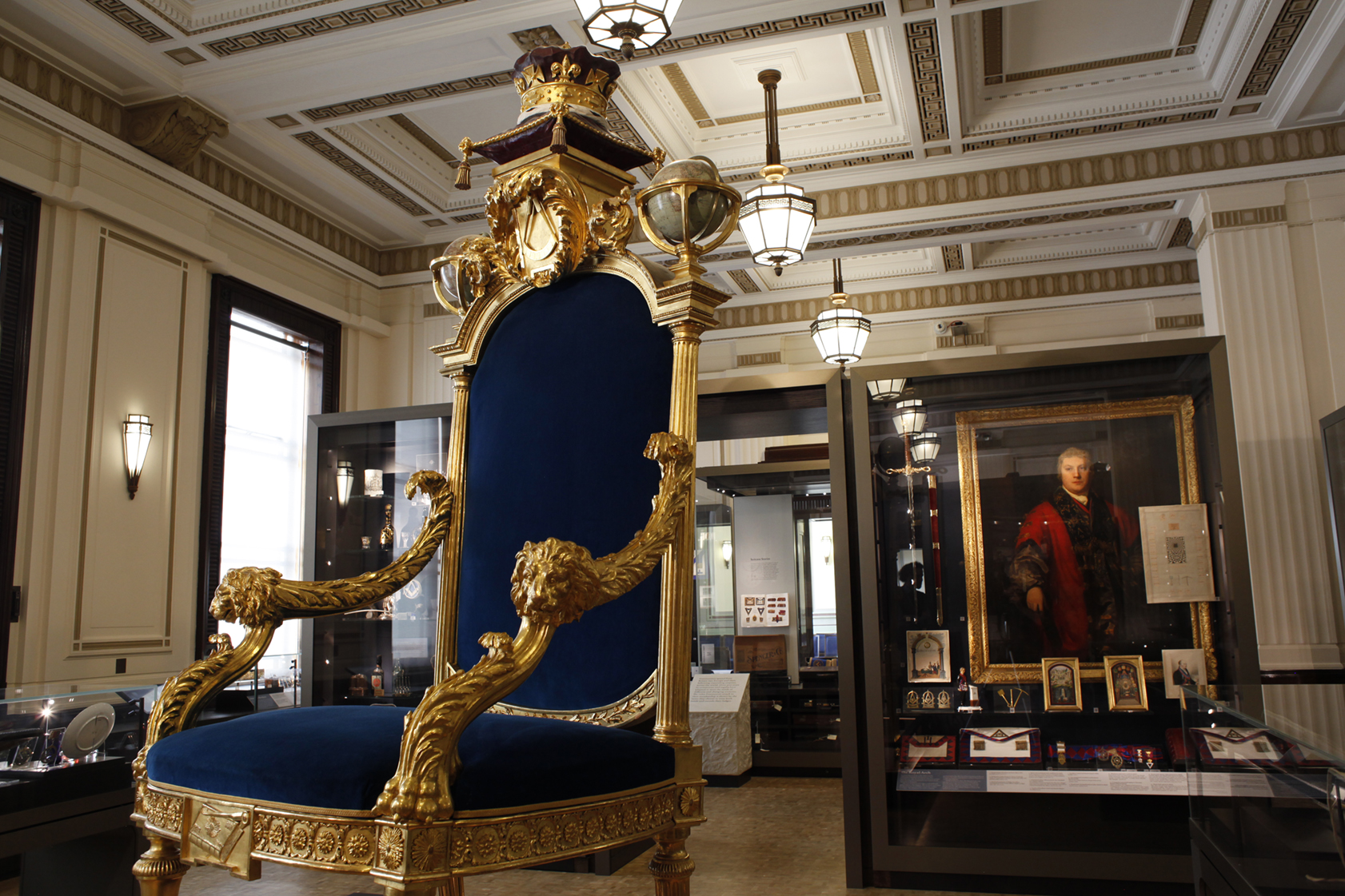
Museum of Freemasonry, North Gallery with Three Centuries of English Freemasonry exhibition, 2018

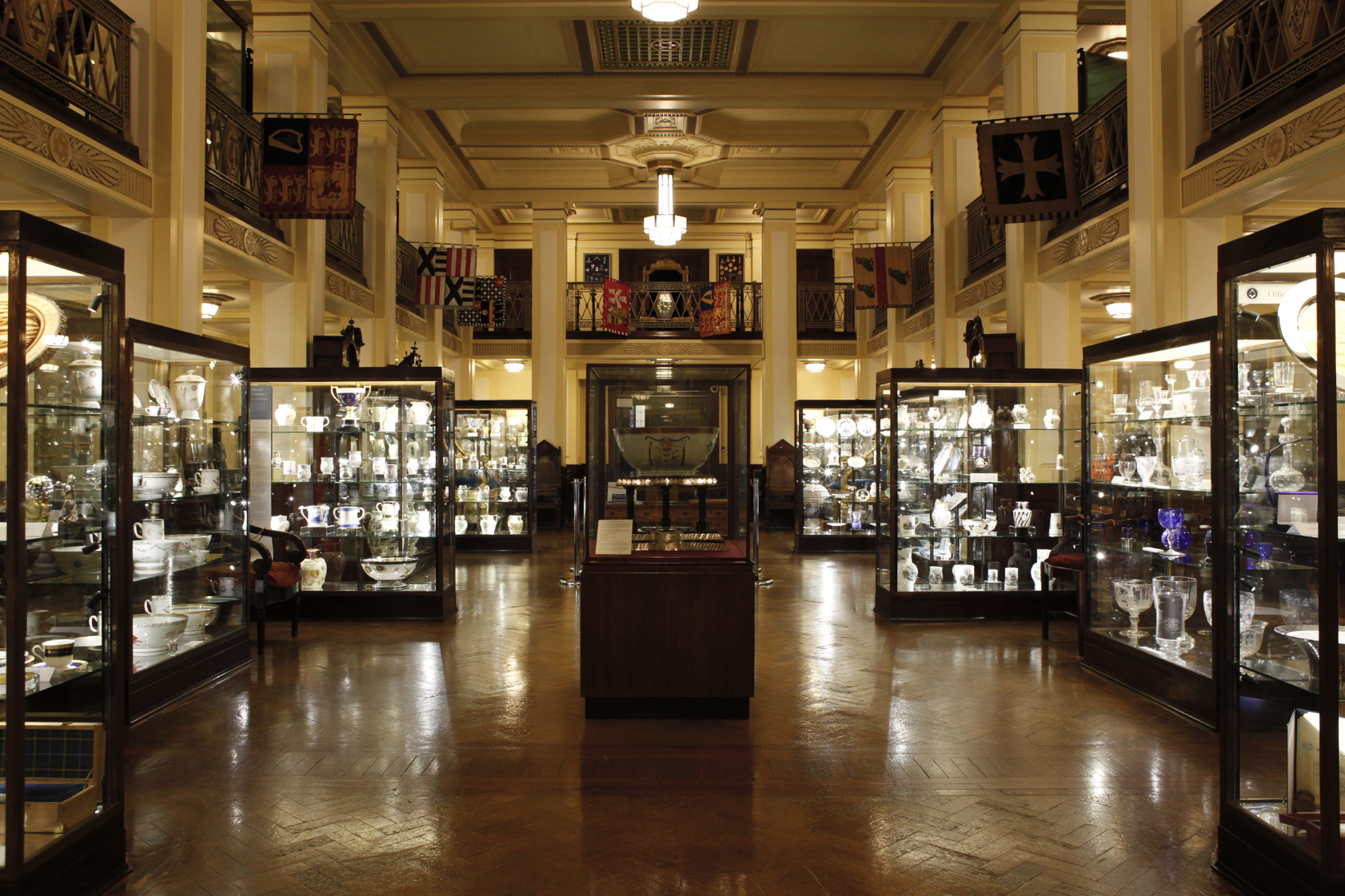
Museum of Freemasonry, South Gallery, 2018

Museum of Freemasonry (previously known as the Library and Museum of Freemasonry), based at Freemasons’ Hall, London, is a fully accredited museum since 2009, with a designated outstanding collection of national importance since 2007 and registered charitable trust (Registered Charity number 1058497) since 1996. The facility encompasses a museum, library, and archive.

The collections are composed of masonic ceremonial objects, jewellery, regalia, ceramics, glassware, silverware, clocks, furniture, books, prints and manuscripts relating to English freemasonry and its interactions with overseas lodges and orders. It also retains artefacts relating to other associated fraternal orders and friendly societies such as the Oddfellows, Hermetic Order of the Golden Dawn, Sons of the Phoenix and Societas Rosicruciana in Anglia.

The Museum is open to the public Monday to Saturday, 10am to 5pm. Admission is free.

== History ==
At the Quarterly Communication of the United Grand Lodge of England on 7 March 1838, it was announced:

"...that a sum of money not exceeding £100 to be placed at the disposal of the Board for the purpose of providing for the reception of books, manuscripts and objects of masonic interest, and for commencing the formation of the Library and Museum."

Following a campaign for donations among members, by 1841 the Library and Museum was open to English freemasons of the Grand Lodge. When the third and present Freemasons’ Hall opened at Great Queen Street in 1933 it included a dedicated space for the Library and Museum, which was a stipulation of the architectural competition won by architects Ashley and Newman. Gordon Hills was the Librarian and Curator who oversaw this most significant move, and the original space remains the home of the Museum today.

In the 1980s the Library and Museum began opening to the public for the first time on certain days, and in 1996, under Librarian and Curator John Hamill, the Library and Museum became a charitable trust. The permanent collection held by the Museum that existed before the change in 1996 is a permanent loan from the United Grand Lodge of England and makes up approximately 80% of the collection. From 1996, new acquisitions, whether purchased or donated, normally belong to the Library and Museum Charitable Trust. From 2001 there has been an evolving electronic catalogue and succession of supporting public exhibitions and events. From 2003, various projects partly funded by external bodies such as the Heritage Lottery Fund, have seen certain sections of the archive collection catalogued.

In 1999 the Trust appointed Diane Clements as Director who oversaw an individual Librarian, Curator and Archivist to manage each department. The appointment of Mrs Clements broke with the tradition of having a mason in charge of the collection, although trustees include senior members of Grand Lodge. In 2017, Mrs Clements was succeeded by Dr Vicky Carroll as Director, who oversaw a process of redevelopment beginning with a change of name from the Library and Museum of Freemasonry to the Museum of Freemasonry.

== Building ==
The Museum of Freemasonry is located on the first floor of Freemasons' Hall, Great Queen Street, London. Originally known as the Masonic Peace Memorial Building, the imposing landmark found on the edge of Covent Garden was designed by architects Ashley and Newman in the Art Deco style and completed in 1933. It is a Grade II* listed building today. In addition to the Grand Temple, offices, lodge meeting rooms and the Museum, Freemasons' Hall is a frequently used venue for television and film productions such as James Bond, Assassin's Creed, Spooks and The Crown being shot there more recently.

The Museum of Freemasonry provides free guided tours of the building, taking in the Grand Temple and Shrine. Tours are not available when the Grand Temple or other areas are in use for ceremonial purposes, and groups must book in advance.

== Activities ==
=== Library and Archives ===
The Museum of Freemasonry's reference library and archives provide a number of services including family history and biographical research. There are over 1.7 million names listed in the digital registers from 1751 to 1921.

Lane's Masonic Records Since 2003 the Museum has collaborated with the Humanities Research Institute at The University of Sheffield to digitise John Lane’s Masonic Records 1717-1894, which “is an authoritative listing of all the lodges established by the English Grand Lodges from the foundation of the first Grand Lodge in 1717 up until 1894.”

Masonic Periodicals Online: The Museum has digitised and made searchable a collection of masonic periodicals from 1790 up until 1900. Titles include The Freemasons’ Quarterly Review (1834-1854), The Freemasons’ Monthly Magazine (1855-1871), The Freemason (1869-1901), The Masonic Illustrated (1900-1906).

The library is currently the home to a rare collection of 400+ year old Rosicrucian books, letters, and manuscripts, which are on loan from the Societas Rosicruciana in Anglia.

=== Exhibitions ===
Since the 1980s the Museum of Freemasonry has presented temporary thematic exhibitions to the general public.

In 2017 the museum opened Three Centuries of English Freemasonry in its North Gallery to mark the tercentenary of the formation of the first Grand Lodge of England. Recent exhibitions include:

- Bejewelled: Badges, Brotherhood and Identity (20 September 2018 – 24 August 2019)
- Brethren Beyond the Seas (24 April 2017 - 23 February 2018)
- Healing Through Kindness (11 April 2016 – 7 April 2017)
- Spotlight: Freemasons and Entertainment (8 June 2015 – 13 February 2016)
- Treasures of the SRIA

=== Learning and exploring ===
The Museum's collection catalogue is available to freely search online via the website.

As well as delivering free talks and workshops on freemasonry, genealogical research and museum studies, the Museum regularly takes part in national cultural initiatives such as Museums at Night and Open House London.

The Museum of Freemasonry is a member of the cultural collective Museum Mile, London, located in the London Borough of Camden.

== Famous Freemasons ==
The Museum of Freemasonry holds masonic artifacts belonging to individuals of note including:

- Malcolm Campbell, 1885–1948, British land and water speed record holder
- Winston Churchill, 1874–1965, British politician and former Prime Minister
- Alvin Langdon Coburn, 1882–1966, American photographer
- Wally Hammond, 1903–1965, British cricket player
- King Edward VII, 1841–1910, British monarch
- King George IV, 1762–1830, British monarch
- Rudyard Kipling, 1865–1936, British poet and author
- Herbert Kitchener, 1st Earl Kitchener, 1850–1916, British Army Field Marshall
- Alphonse Mucha, 1860–1939, Czech painter and designer
- Prince Augustus Frederick, The Duke of Sussex, 1773–1843, British royal
- Theodor Reuss, 1855–1923, German signer and occultist
- Herbert Sutcliffe, 1894–1978, British cricket player
- Oscar Wilde, 1854–1900, Irish poet and dramatist
- Johan Zoffany, 1733–1810, German painter and engraver
