= Llanelli Talking Newspaper =

Welsh talking newspaper

- Type: Fortnightly talking newspaper
- Format: CD
- Founded: December 1976; 48 years ago
- Political alignment: None
- Headquarters: Princess Street, Llanelli
- Website: llanellitalkingnewspaper.org.uk

The Llanelli Talking Newspaper is a Welsh talking newspaper covering the areas of Llanelli in the county of Carmarthenshire, Wales. It is published on a fortnightly basis in a CD form to hundreds of visually impaired people. It was founded in December 1976 with currently 1000 editions recorded. As of 2015, the editions have been made available online. It is a member of Talking Newspaper Association of the United Kingdom.
