= The Apocalypse Fire =

2016 novel by Dominic Selwood

- Author: Dominic Selwood
- Genre: mystery, detective fiction, conspiracy fiction, thriller
- Published: 31 October 2016 Canelo
- Publication place: England
- ISBN: 978-0-9926332-7-1
- Dewey Decimal: 823.92

The Apocalypse Fire is a 2016 mystery detective thriller novel by the English historian and journalist Dominic Selwood. It is part two of the Ava Curzon trilogy and sequel to The Sword of Moses.

The novel's premise involves a hunt for an ancient biblical book to stave off a planned apocalypse in the Middle East, and features Dr Ava Curzon, an ex-MI6 archaeologist working at the British Museum.

== Plot summary ==
Ava Curzon has returned from Baghdad to the British Museum, and is recruited by Britain’s ultra-secretive MI13 intelligence department to assist in recovering the Turin Shroud, which has been stolen by a Russian special forces team. As the chase moves to London, she finds herself on the trail of Oleg Durov, a Russian oligarch, who leads an apocalyptic group of castrati known as the Skoptsy.

With the stakes rising, Ava discovers that Durov possesses two of Rasputin’s personal notebooks, in which the Russian mystic left baffling clues. After a brazen attempt on her life, she infiltrates the headquarters of the mysterious Order of Malta in Rome, where the quest becomes infinitely more dangerous. Following up a hunch, she becomes involved with Mexican gang in London smuggling war-looted antiquities from the Middle East, and finds herself playing a lethal game over an ancient Aramaic artefact like none she has ever seen before. After re-establishing contact with Uri, a Mossad assassin, she solves Rasputin’s clues, which lead her to the Church of the Holy Sepulchre in Jerusalem, where she finds an ancient manuscript hidden by a medieval Knight of Saint John.

As the net closes in on her, she solves the riddle of the knight’s manuscript, and is propelled towards the chilling climax, where she must confronts Durov and the Skoptsy at an ancient castle in the south of France. There, she finally comes face to face with the ancient biblical manuscript that has been driving the mystery all along. Finally, in the husk of the ancient Cathar castle of Montségur, where the medieval heretics were burned alive, she has to face Durov, and present him from unleashing his plan of devastation in the Middle East.

== Principal Characters ==
- Dr Ava Curzon, an archaeologist and former MI6 officer, now working at the National Museum of Iraq in Baghdad reassembling the artefacts looted during the 2003 conflict
- David Ferguson, a former British army soldier, now with MI6
- Oleg Antonevich Durov, leader of the Skoptsy, an apocalyptic group of castrati
- Mary, an officer with the Vatican Intelligence Department
- Jack Swinton, an officer of Britain’s MI13 intelligence agency
- Sir Mark Jennings, a senior diplomat in the British Foreign Office
- Joaquín de Torquemada, Grand Master of the secretive Order of Malta
- Uri, a member of Mossad's Metsada department

== Critical reception ==
It was chosen by BBC radio as a feature “tale of violence, cults, and religious extremists”. It was described by the British Army's official publication, Soldier Magazine, as "Imagine the best of James Bond and The Da Vinci Code rolled into one, and that is what you get with this book". The UK's Catholic Herald newspaper said it "Keeps the tension ratcheted up ... Selwood breathes life into the conspiracy thriller by knowing his history and deploying it well." Counsel Magazine said "No frills … taut and tight … the story moves with the pace and grace of a Hollywood screenplay".
