= Edge Grove School =

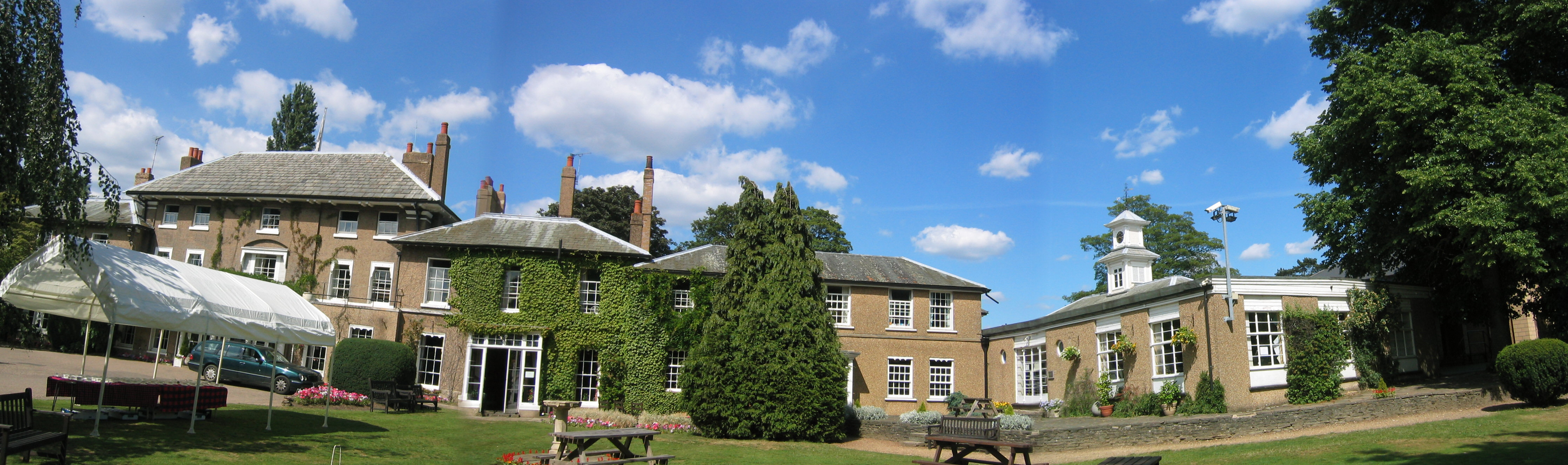
- Front of school

Location
- High Cross, Aldenham; Watford, Hertfordshire, WD25 8NL; England; 51.6771°N 0.3461°W

Information
- Other name: Edge Grove
- Type: Private, day preparatory school
- Established: 1935
- Local authority: Hertfordshire County Council
- Department for Education URN: 117601 Tables
- Headmaster: Richard Stanley
- Gender: Mixed
- Age range: 2-13
- Enrolment: 425
- Capacity: 500
- Campus size: 48 acres (19 ha)
- Houses: Hedgerows; Sarnesfield; Churchill; Stratton; Gills
- Website: www.edgegrove.com

Edge Grove School, simply Edge Grove, is a 2-13 mixed, private, day preparatory school in Aldenham, Watford, Hertfordshire, England. It was established in 1935 and has 48 acres of grounds.

== History ==
John Skey bought the land on which the current property in 1733 and built the main block of what now stands as the main house. This house was then sold by his sons to Thomas Hake some time in the late 1780s. The American financier and banker J. P. Morgan bought the property in 1912 and rented it to Richard Bennett. Bennett converted the house with around £90,000, leading to the house as it stands currently. When it came to settling his estate, Morgan arranged for the council to take the freehold, specifying it should be used as an independent school.

The headmaster as of October 2024 is Richard Stanley.

== Facilities ==
The school has a large sports hall, all-weather tennis/netball courts, an AstroTurf pitch, 9 acres of playing fields, indoor & outdoor cricket nets and a heated outdoor swimming pool.

In November 2019, it opened a £3.6m lower school building for Years 3 and 4.

== Headmasters ==
- John Baugh: 1997–2002
- Jolyon Waterfield: 1985–1997
- Richard Stanley: 2024–present

== Notable alumni ==
- Marcus Buckingham, award-winning author and motivational speaker
- Dominic Selwood, historian and author
- Dominic Treadwell-Collins, Television Producer
- Lieutenant-Colonel Tony Streather (1936-1940) was a mountaineer of the Himalayas during the so-called "the golden age" in the 1950s.
