= Soldier Magazine =

SOLDIER Magazine
- Frequency: Monthly
- First issue: March 1945
- Company: Ministry of Defence
- Country: United Kingdom
- Based in: Aldershot Garrison
- Language: English
- Website: http://www.soldiermagazine.co.uk/

SOLDIER Magazine, the official monthly publication of the British Army, is produced by an in-house team and published by the Ministry of Defence. It is aimed primarily at junior ranks but also to all ranks of the British Army, cadets and the wider military community, including veterans and members of the public with an interest in militaria.

Its objectives include providing a channel of welfare information; promoting the British Army's image internally and externally; and contributing to the upkeep of morale within the Service.

The magazine is distributed free to serving personnel (70,000 copies), but paid-for subscriptions – an unusual requirement for a government-sponsored publication – have risen year-on-year, most recently by 2 per cent. SOLDIER subscribers number 2,627 (as of December 2007), with an additional 4,514 copies sold through newsagents in the UK. About 15,000 visitors from 85 countries read the magazine online each month, taking away a positive impression of the British Army.

In January 2008, a free-access digital edition of SOLDIER was launched on the World Wide Web.

The range of coverage includes news sections; features; celebrity interviews; sport; music, book and games reviews; and, crucially, a controversial warts-and-all correspondence section, in which military personnel are invited to have their say. After some initial misgivings about "washing dirty linen in public" the Army's chain of command is now fully signed up to the section, regarding it both as a valuable pressure valve for serving personnel with grievances, and confirmation of issues flagged up by the MOD's independent Continuous Attitude Surveys and the Chief of the General Staff's Briefing Team.

Tapes and CDs of the magazine produced by the Talking Newspapers organisation are used for English language tutoring of Gurkha recruits, and the magazine is extensively used as a language learning aid by British Council teachers instructing former Soviet Bloc military personnel under the British Government's Partnership for Peace initiative.

== History ==
Given the go-ahead by Field Marshal Bernard Montgomery as a morale-boosting magazine for British Liberation Army troops then fighting in Europe during the Second World War, the first fortnightly edition of SOLDIER was printed in Brussels in March 1945. It was conceived by Colonel Sean Fielding (later to become Editor of The Tatler and Daily Express) while he was serving in the Western Desert. Its first editor was Philip 'Pip' Youngman Carter (the husband of detective fiction writer Margery Allingham) who, in due course, also went on to become editor of The Tatler. A reporter from SOLDIER was one of the first to record the horrors of the Belsen concentration camp and the magazine's "scoops" included revealing the secret engineering feat of Operation Pluto.

The publication was expected to disappear as peace and normality returned, but survived to become the house magazine of the entire British Army. As the Armed Forces reduced in size after the War, so the magazine's circulation declined to fewer than 20,000 by the end of the 1980s. It was radically redesigned in October 1997 and changed from fortnightly to monthly publication. It is printed by Wyndeham (Roche).

== Awards ==
Since switching in October 1997 from fortnightly production to an expanded monthly aimed broadly at a younger audience, SOLDIER was named in 1998, 2000 and 2005 as the best internal magazine in Britain by the British Association of Communicators in Business (CiB), the leading professional corporate communicators' body in the UK. It was named the best internal magazine in Britain for 2009, 2010 and 2011 by the Chartered Institute of Public Relations and was awarded the same title in 2010 by the Institute of Internal Communication.
