= Museum Mile, London =

Home of fourteen museums in London, England

Coordinates: 51.51777°N 0.121965°W

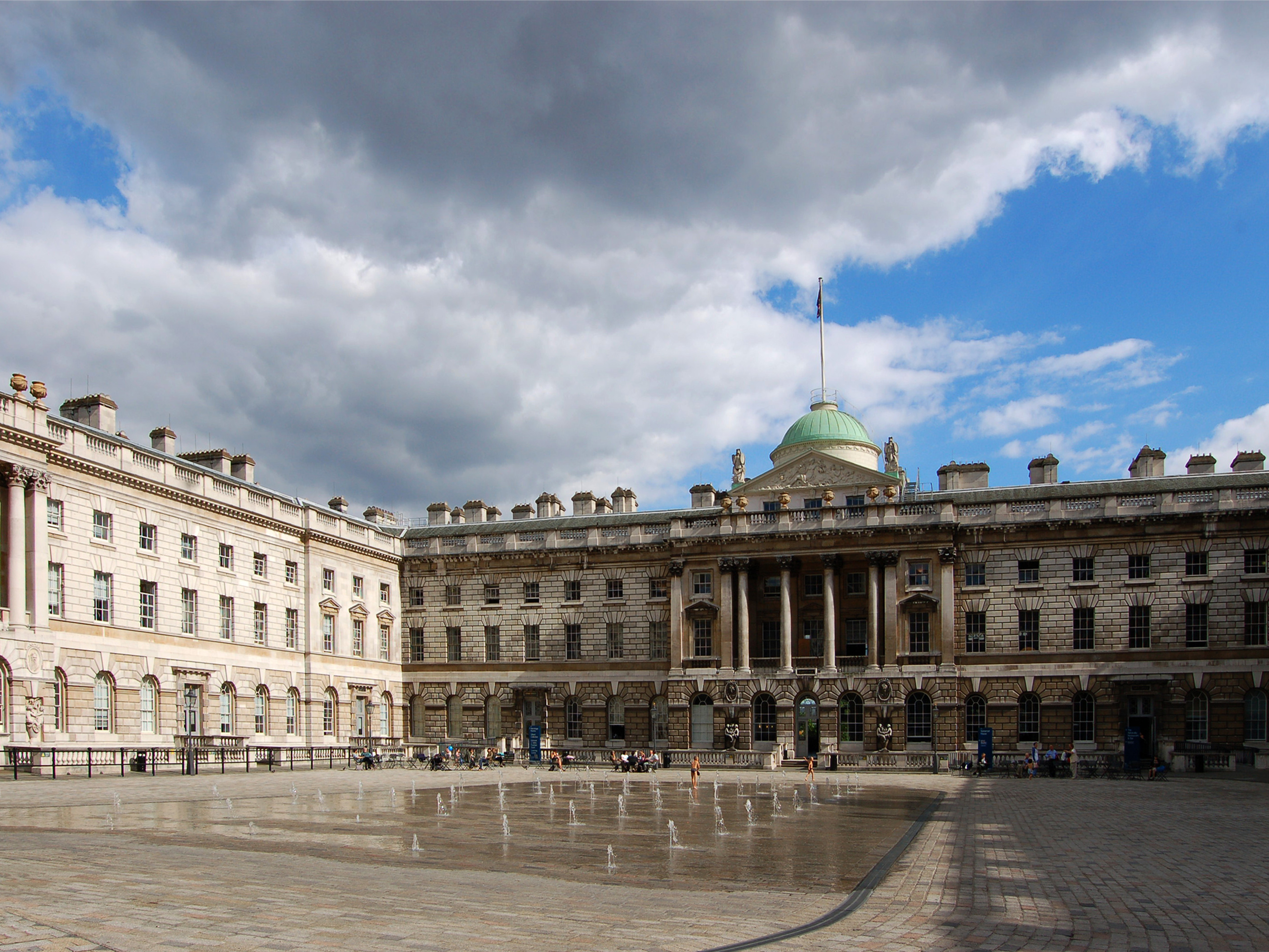
Somerset House, the contemporary arts centre and home of the Courtauld Gallery, two of the Museum Mile institutions in London, England

Museum Mile London is the home of 14 museums in London, England, in the area between Bloomsbury to the north and the Embankment on the River Thames to the south.

The area is located in the London Borough of Camden. The route includes Woburn Place, Russell Square, Southampton Row, Kingsway, and the Aldwych.

The museums and related cultural institutions with collections that are included are:

- The British Museum
- The Brunei Gallery, SOAS
- Charles Dickens Museum
- Somerset House
- The Courtauld Gallery
- The Foundling Museum
- Hunterian Museum
- Museum of Freemasonry
- London Transport Museum
- Sir John Soane's Museum
- University College London museums and collections including:
  - Petrie Museum of Egyptian Archaeology
  - Grant Museum of Zoology and Comparative Anatomy
  - UCL Art Museum
- Wellcome Collection

Museum Mile London's role is to establish new connections between people and its collections, so they can benefit everyone. It wants to spark people's curiosity, enticing them to explore new works, stories and spaces, amongst collections that capture every interest. It also provides a space for museum staff to connect and share ideas.

== See also ==
- Albertopolis, in South Kensington, London
- List of museums in London
- Knowledge Quarter, London
