= Talking Newspaper Association of the United Kingdom =

Disability organization of the United Kingdom

National Talking Newspapers & Magazines (NTN&M) is a charitable organisation no longer based out of Heathfield East Sussex in the United Kingdom. They were previously known as Talking Newspaper Association of the United Kingdom or TNAUK. NTN&M provides audio versions of national newspapers and magazines in various formats such as audio cassette, CD, DAISY Digital Talking Book format as well as available online via MP3 and full E-text download, CD-ROM and email for the blind, disabled, and visually impaired. NTN&M currently offers audio transcriptions of over 200 individual publications and distributes over two million audio cassettes annually. Until recently most recordings were made in their nine Heathfield based studios, which worked continuously with the aid of volunteer readers Monday to Friday, 9 am to 5 pm.

NTN&M was established in 1974 as a membership network of individual, local "talking newspapers", projects to individually transcribe local and national newspapers and magazines into audio format. In 1983 operations were expanded to a national distribution service, and as membership swelled to over 500 individual talking newspapers across the country, NTN&M transferred the local newspaper responsibilities to the Talking News Federation and now focuses solely upon the transcription and distribution of national titles, acting as a newsagent for its customers. In 2010, NTN&M went into a three-year partnership with RNIB.

NTN&M have a commercial arm, Sound Talking, which produces corporate and commercial audio recordings to help raise money for the charity.

== See also ==
- Llanelli Talking Newspaper
- West German Audio Book Library for the Blind
