= The Sword of Moses (novel) =

2013 novel by Dominic Selwood

- First edition
- Author: Dominic Selwood
- Genre: mystery, detective fiction, conspiracy fiction, thriller
- Published: 14 August 2013 Corax
- Publication place: England
- ISBN: 978-0-9926332-0-2
- Dewey Decimal: 823.92

The Sword of Moses is a 2013 mystery detective thriller novel by the English historian and journalist Dominic Selwood. It is part one of the Ava Curzon trilogy.

The novel's premise involves the infamous ancient Hebrew magical text, The Sword of Moses, and features Dr Ava Curzon, an archaeologist working in the National Museum of Iraq in Baghdad reassembling the collections looted during the 2003 invasion.

== Plot summary ==
When former MI6 agent turned archaeologist Dr Ava Curzon is engaged by American intelligence to track down an African militia claiming to hold the Ark of the Covenant, she is plunged into a world where nothing is what it seems.

Her breakneck descent into the shadowy realm of dark biblical texts hurls her across continents and deep into the opaque worlds of the Knights Templar and neo-Nazis, pushing her mentally and physically to the limits.

Her initial compulsion to find the Ark soon becomes more urgent when she discovers that Marius Malchus, the man holding it, was responsible for her father’s murder years earlier. As she pursues Malchus across Europe and the Middle East, she is repeatedly thwarted and placed in ever greater physical danger, experiencing his extreme ruthlessness at first hand.

When an informant in Malchus’s group sends her photographs of a coded medieval lead medal, she begins unravelling a series of arcane clues that take her to the heart of an ancient mystery buried by the medieval Vatican, but now driving Malchus towards an apocalyptic endgame.

As Ava penetrates deeper into the shadows, the Vatican medal leads her to the sacred biblical seven-branched Menorah candlestick buried in an ancient Mithraic Temple deep under Rome and to a series of ever more challenging puzzles. Harnessing all her mental and physical skills, the danger levels increase as she solves a clue related to the enigmatic Voynich manuscript, and closes in on Malchus and his prize: a powerful ancient Hebrew magical manuscript called The Sword of Moses.

She is helped by David Ferguson, a former British soldier, Peter DeVere of MI6, Anna Prince of American intelligence, and a group which is eventually revealed as the outlawed medieval Knights Templar, still active and all-powerful in the shadows. As her relationships turn out to be more complex and treacherous than she ever imagined, she is repeatedly betrayed and realizes she can trust no one.

While she moves inexorably closer to Malchus and the evil he is planning, Uri, an agent from Mossad’s infamous Metsada assassination unit is also chasing Malchus and the Ark, infiltrating Malchus’s neo-Nazis and placing himself on a collision course with Ava.

Having solved the final clue, the climax takes Ava to Malchus’s isolated house on the shores of Loch Ness, where the English occultist Aleister Crowley once conducted his dark rites. Ava is captured and subjected to a horrifying ordeal, before being betrayed again and taken to the former Nazi SS ‘grail castle’ at Wewelsburg, where she becomes the centrepiece of a sadistic ritual in which her fate is entwined with the dark contents of The Sword of Moses, the Ark, the Menorah, and a terrifying plan to launch the Fourth Reich.

After a climactic and action-charged showdown with Uri and Malchus, Ava finally comes face-to-face with the Ark, and with the opportunity to avenge the death of her father. In a last scene, the Grand Master of the Knights Templar takes her to the breathtaking Templar chapel of Montsaunès, where he reveals an age-old secret that explains what has been driving the dramatic events, and draws them to a resolution and conclusion.

== Principal Characters ==
- Dr Ava Curzon, an archaeologist and former MI6 officer, now working at the National Museum of Iraq in Baghdad reassembling the artefacts looted during the 2003 conflict
- David Ferguson, a former British army soldier, now with MI6
- Peter DeVere, a senior MI6 officer
- Anna Prince, a senior US Defence Intelligence Staff officer
- Olivier De Molay, hereditary Grand Master of the Knights Templar
- Edmund Saxby, a senior Knight Templar
- Marius Malchus, a neo-Nazi leader and former Stasi officer
- Uri, a member of Mossad's Metsada department

== Critical reception ==
It was described as "The thinking person's Da Vinci Code" by BBC Radio. and Editor's five star 'Pick of the Week' by the UK's Daily Express newspaper. It was voted one of the top five religious thrillers of all time by BestThrillers.com.

== Sequel ==
The 2016 sequel is The Apocalypse Fire.
