= Dominic Selwood =

British historian (born 1970)

Dominic Selwood FSA FRSA FRHistS
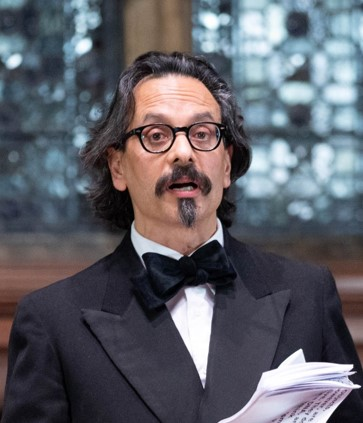
- Born: 19 December 1970 (age 55); England
- Education: University of Oxford; Pantheon-Sorbonne; University of Poitiers; University of Wales
- Occupations: Historian; author; journalist; barrister
- Notable work: Anatomy of a Nation (2021); The Sword of Moses (2013)
- Military career
- Allegiance: United Kingdom
- Branch: British Army
- Service years: 2015–2022
- Rank: Captain
- Unit: General Service Corps (Reserve)
- Website: dominicselwood.com

Dominic Selwood FSA FRSA FRHistS (born 19 December 1970) is an English historian, author, journalist and barrister. He has written several works of history, historical fiction and historical thrillers, most notably The Sword of Moses and Anatomy of a Nation. A History of British Identity in 50 Documents. His background is in medieval history.

== Early life and career ==
Selwood was born on 19 December 1970 in England, and grew up in Salisbury, Cyprus, and Germany. He went to school at Edge Grove School and Winchester College, and studied law and French law at the University of Wales.

He was awarded a scholarship to the University of Poitiers, where a chance meeting in a local café with the publisher (and early sponsor of Private Eye) Anthony Blond led to a collaboration on Blond's Roman Emperors. His doctoral research on medieval religious and military life, specialising in the Knights Templar and Knights Hospitaller, the two leading military orders of the Crusades, was undertaken as a member of New College, Oxford. While conducting his research, he won a research scholarship to the Sorbonne in Paris specializing in the history of Byzantium and the Christian Near-East, where he was awarded a double first class.

He was called to the Bar in London by Lincoln's Inn, joined a set of barristers' chambers in the Inner Temple, and was a member of the Western Circuit. In a 2014 interview he said that his work as a criminal barrister had been formative for writing thrillers.

Selwood says he is "obsessed with the weirder side of the past", and describes himself as a "deeply fuzzy and laissez-faire English Catholic". He speaks regularly about history in the media, at schools, universities, literary festivals, learned societies and institutions like the British Library and British Museum.

Selwood served in the British Army Reserve, attending the Royal Military Academy Sandhurst, before commissioning into the General Service Corps, reaching the rank of Captain.

In 2025 he was a judge of the Jane Austen Literacy Foundation's writing competition. Regarding his own writing he says he writes wherever and whenever he can, and wrote The Sword of Moses largely on a BlackBerry while travelling.

In 2025 he argued in favour of Britain retaining its historic collection of the Parthenon's sculptures (also known as the Elgin Marbles) in the first major debate in Greece on the subject, held in the Old Parliament House in Athens.

== Historical positions ==
Selwood is an Honorary Research Fellow in history at the University of Exeter. He is a member of the Blue Plaques panel for the City of London and an advisor on the Heritage Working Group of Southwark Cathedral.

In 1997 he was elected a Fellow of the Royal Historical Society, and he is also an elected Fellow of the Society of Antiquaries of London and a Fellow of the Royal Society of Arts.

== Journalism and media ==
=== Newspapers and magazines ===
Selwood writes as a non-political journalist for the UK's Daily Telegraph newspaper and is currently a resident history columnist, including the daily 'On this Day' column. His writing has been described as a "must read", "a fascinating change from the usual dusty history books", and "strident debunkery". He has also written and reviewed for The Times Literary Supplement, The New Statesman, The Spectator, The Independent, CityAM, Prospect Magazine, The Harvard Business Review, The Tablet and The Catholic Herald.

=== Television and radio ===
He appears regularly on television and radio as a historical commentator and adviser, and on discussion shows like the BBC's The Big Questions. He appears often on international news programmes explaining historical events, and is a regular on the Discovery Channel's prime time series Mysteries of the Abandoned.

== Bibliography ==
=== Non-fiction ===
- Saladin, in The Generals. 69 Generals, 69 Authors, 69 Lessons in History edited by Iain Dale, (Hodder & Stoughton, London, 2026) ISBN 978-1399733120
- Genghis Khan, in Dictators. 64 Dictators, 64 Authors, 64 Warnings from History edited by Iain Dale, (Hodder & Stoughton, London, 2024) ISBN 978-1399721608
- Henry I, in Kings and Queens: 1200 Years of English and British Monarchs edited by Iain Dale, (Hodder & Stoughton, London, 2023) ISBN 978-1529379488
- Anatomy of a Nation. A History of British Identity in 50 Documents (Constable, London, 2021) ISBN 978-1472131898
- Punctuation Without Tears: Punctuate Confidently – in Minutes!, illustrated by Delia Johnson, (Corax, London, 2018) ISBN 978-0992633295, voted five stars by The Independent for putting simplicity and fun back into good writing.
- Spies, Sadists and Sorcerers: The History You Weren't Taught at School (Crux Publishing, London, 2015) ISBN 978-1909979338
- Knights of the Cloister (The Boydell Press, Woodbridge, 1999) ISBN 978-0851158280, a study of the medieval Knights Templar and Knights Hospitaller, the first study to deal in detail with their lives and activities in the south of France (their European headquarters), demonstrating how they raised the manpower, money and weapons to support the crusades in the East.

=== Fiction ===
==== Novels ====
- The Apocalypse Fire (Canelo, 2016; Penguin Random House, 2025) ISBN 978-0992633271, a best-selling thriller described by the British Army's official magazine as "the best of James Bond and The Da Vinci Code".
- The Sword of Moses (Corax, 2013; Canelo, 2015; Penguin Random House, 2025) ISBN 978-0992633202, a best-selling thriller, voted Editor's 'Pick of the Week' by the Daily Express (7 February 2014) and one of 'The Five Best Religious Thrillers of All Time' by BestThrillers.com (3 December 2014).

==== Ghost stories ====
- Cotton Cleopatra F VIII: The Abbess's Tale (Corax, London, 2022) ISBN 978-1739097608
- Suffer the Children (Corax, London, 2015) ISBN 978-0992633233
- The Voivod (Corax, London, 2015) ISBN 978-0992633257

== Filmography ==
- The Marbles, Guerilla FIlms, 2025
- Revelation, Cyclops Vision, 2001, starring Terence Stamp, Udo Kier, written and directed by Stuart Urban

== Views ==
=== Museums ===
Selwood has defended universal museums, stressing their origin as Enlightenment foundations as opposed to colonial or imperial trophy cabinets. He has argued for the accurate labelling of museum exhibits to take into account their full histories. He has, in particular, advocated for a historic understanding of the British Museum's acquisition of the Elgin Marbles, noting that the Seventh Earl of Elgin obtained a firman from the Sublime Porte of Constantinople to transport them to Britain, and that Parliament investigated the lawfulness of his possession of the sculptures before purchasing them from him and donating them, in trust, to the British Museum.

In May 2022 Selwood debated Stephen Fry at the Oxford University Union on the subject of repatriating cultural artefacts.

=== British Catholicism ===
Along with Eamonn Duffy, Selwood has written of Britain's strong Catholic heritage before the Reformation, pointing to its vibrancy and long heritage, locating it within a unified European Christendom, and noting the extreme measures used by the Tudors to suppress it.

=== Shroud of Turin ===
Pointing to medieval church records, Selwood has argued for a medieval origin for the Shroud of Turin. In support of this he has pointed to the scientific evidence.

After much toing and froing, the shroud was finally carbon dated in 1988 under the supervision of the British Museum. Laboratories in Oxford, Tucson, and Zurich were each sent a 40-gram section the size of a postage stamp, along with three control samples. The laboratories worked entirely independently of each other, and when the results were in, they all concurred, providing 95 per cent confidence in a date range of AD 1260–1390.

=== Richard III ===
Selwood has argued for the guilt of Richard III in the death of the Princes in the Tower.

Cui bono? is still the starting point for murder investigations the world over, and the main beneficiary of the princes’ permanent exit from the succession was undoubtedly Richard. Not only did he have the strongest motive, but he also had the boys under his absolute control, along with a proven disregard for their entitlements and well-being. He also never made any attempt to explain publicly where they were, or what had happened to them under his ‘protection’.

Selwood has also questioned the accuracy of the DNA tests that identified a skeleton found under a carpark in Leicester in 2012 as the remains of Richard III, pointing to the wrong radiocarbon dating range until adjusted for a fish diet, a wrong male-line Y-chromosome, and likely wrong hair and eye pigmentation.

== Music ==
Dominic Selwood at the 100 Club, Oxford Street, London, 1 October 2026

Selwood played bass in London hard rock band The Binmen with The Sweet and Slade singer Mal McNulty and Ozzy Osbourne and Necromandus drummer Frank Hall. In 2022 he was a guest DJ on Planet Rock radio. He played guitar with the band Psychopomp in the 2025 and 2026 Sustainability Rocks festivals at London's iconic 100 Club.

He has dealt extensively with music in his journalism, and wrote the obituary of Lemmy, founder of Motörhead, in The Spectator, describing him as "a national treasure – a unique collision of swing and amphetamines". He also wrote the obituary of Ozzy Osbourne, lead singer of Black Sabbath and solo artist, for the same magazine, crediting him and Black Sabbath with having "sculpted a foreboding, menacing, thunderous soundscape ... [making them] ... the ur-fathers of heavy metal".
