= List of privately owned public spaces in London =

This is a list of noteworthy privately owned public spaces in London, England.

== Open spaces ==
- Athletes Village, London
- Bishops Square, Spitalfields
- Broadgate
- Brown Hart Gardens
- Canary Wharf
- Cardinal Place, Victoria
- Central St Giles
- More London
- Excel Centre, Royal Victoria Docks
- Hay's Galleria
- King's Cross Central – but note that Camden Council has adopted the streets and public areas
- the London Eye
- Nine Elms
- Queen Elizabeth Olympic Park
- Paddington Waterside
- Paternoster Square
- Regent's Place
- Rochester Square
- Tower Bridge
- Westfield Stratford City
