= Townshend Landscape Architects =

British landscape architectural firm

Townshend Landscape Architects are a London-based Landscape Architecture practice established in 1988 by Robert Townshend. The practice specialises in landscape architecture, public realm masterplanning and urban design in the UK, Europe, Middle East, and Far East.

Projects of note include More London, a mixed-use development including the City Hall offices designed by Foster and Partners on the southern bank of the Thames between London Bridge and Tower Bridge, the design of the open spaces and infrastructure at Brindleyplace in Birmingham, Bishops Square public realm and roof terraces, and are joint masterplaners for King's Cross Central masterplan with Allies and Morrison and Demetri Porphyrios for the 72-acre (290,000 m^{2}) brownfield site to the north of King's Cross and St Pancras Stations which includes Granary Square.

== Gallery ==
The Rill towards Tower Bridge, MoreLondon

The Fountains towards Tower of London, MoreLondon

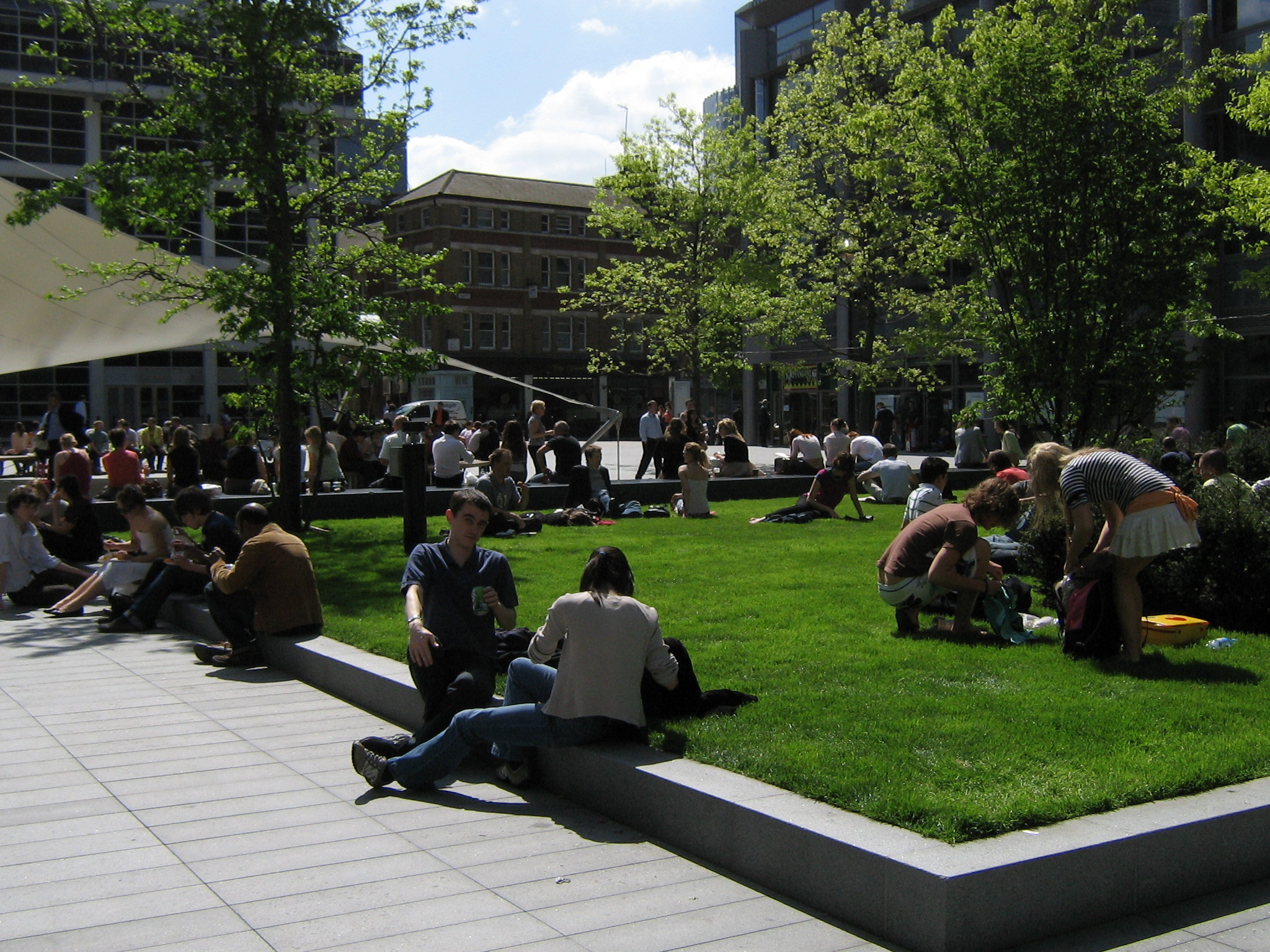
Bishops Square, Spitalfields

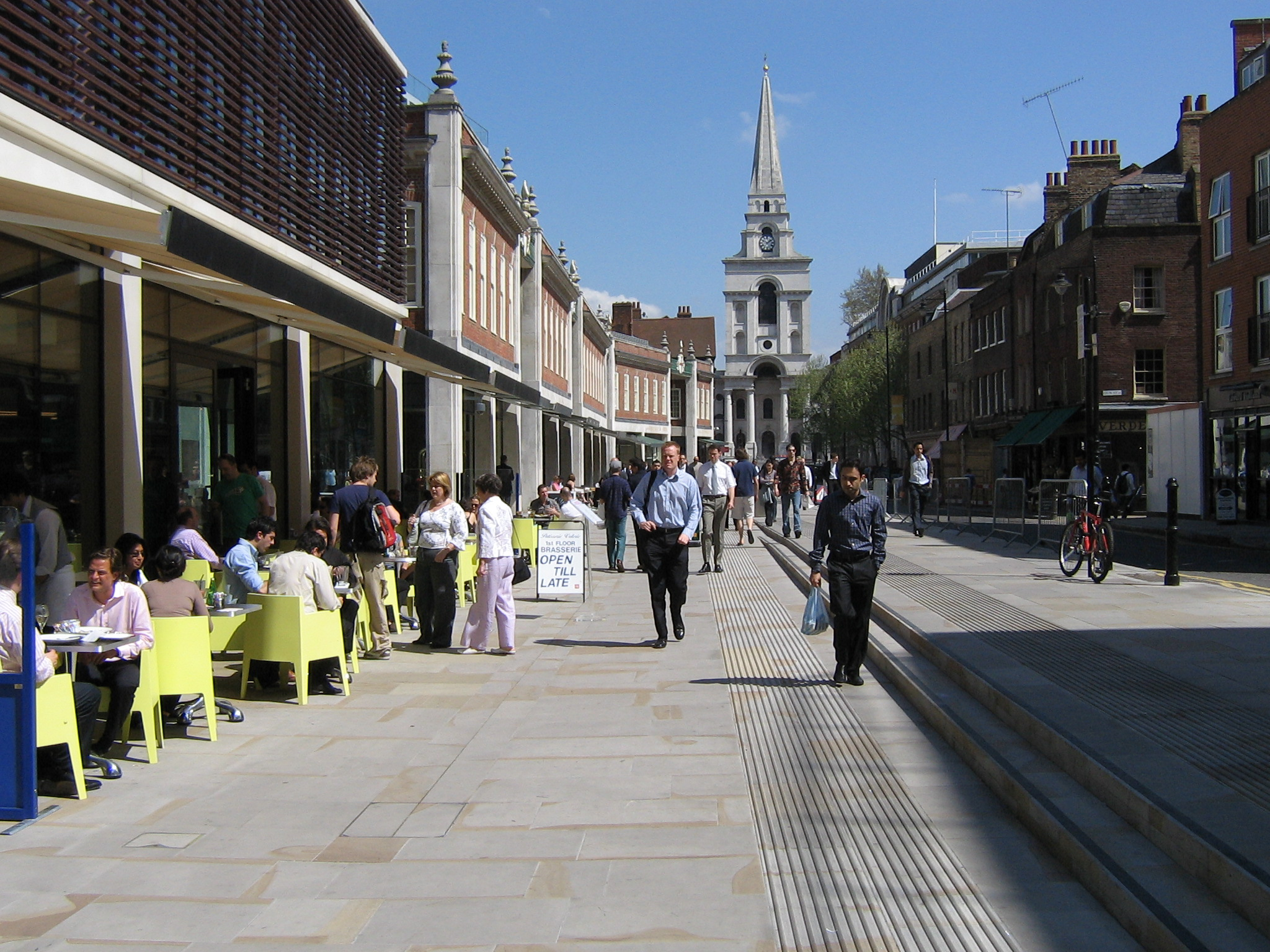
Brushfield Street, Spitalfields

Seating area under atrium

== Selected projects ==
- More London, London
- King's Cross Central, London
- Spitalfields, London
- Brindleyplace, Birmingham
- Granary Square, London
- The Crystal, London
- Corvin Promenade, Budapest, Hungary
- Metropole, Warsaw, Poland
- Château de Villandry, France
- Carter Lane, St Paul's Cathedral, London
- Tower Place, London
- Bluewater Shopping Centre, Kent
- Central Spine, Manchester
- Bankside 123, London
- Ropemaker Roof Terraces, London
- Abu Dhabi Investment Council Headquarters, Abu Dhabi, United Arab Emirates
- Esplanade Quarter, Jersey
- Plaza of Nations, Vancouver, Canada

== Awards ==
- 2000 Civic Trust Award - Central Square & Oozells Square, Brindley Place
- 2005 London Planning Awards, Best Built Project contributing to London's Future - Bishops Square, London
- 2007 London Planning Awards, The Mayor's Award for Excellence in Planning - King's Cross Central
- 2007 London Planning Awards, Best New Public Space - Bishops Square, London
