= More London =

Development on the south bank of the River Thames in London

Coordinates: 51.505°N 0.080°W

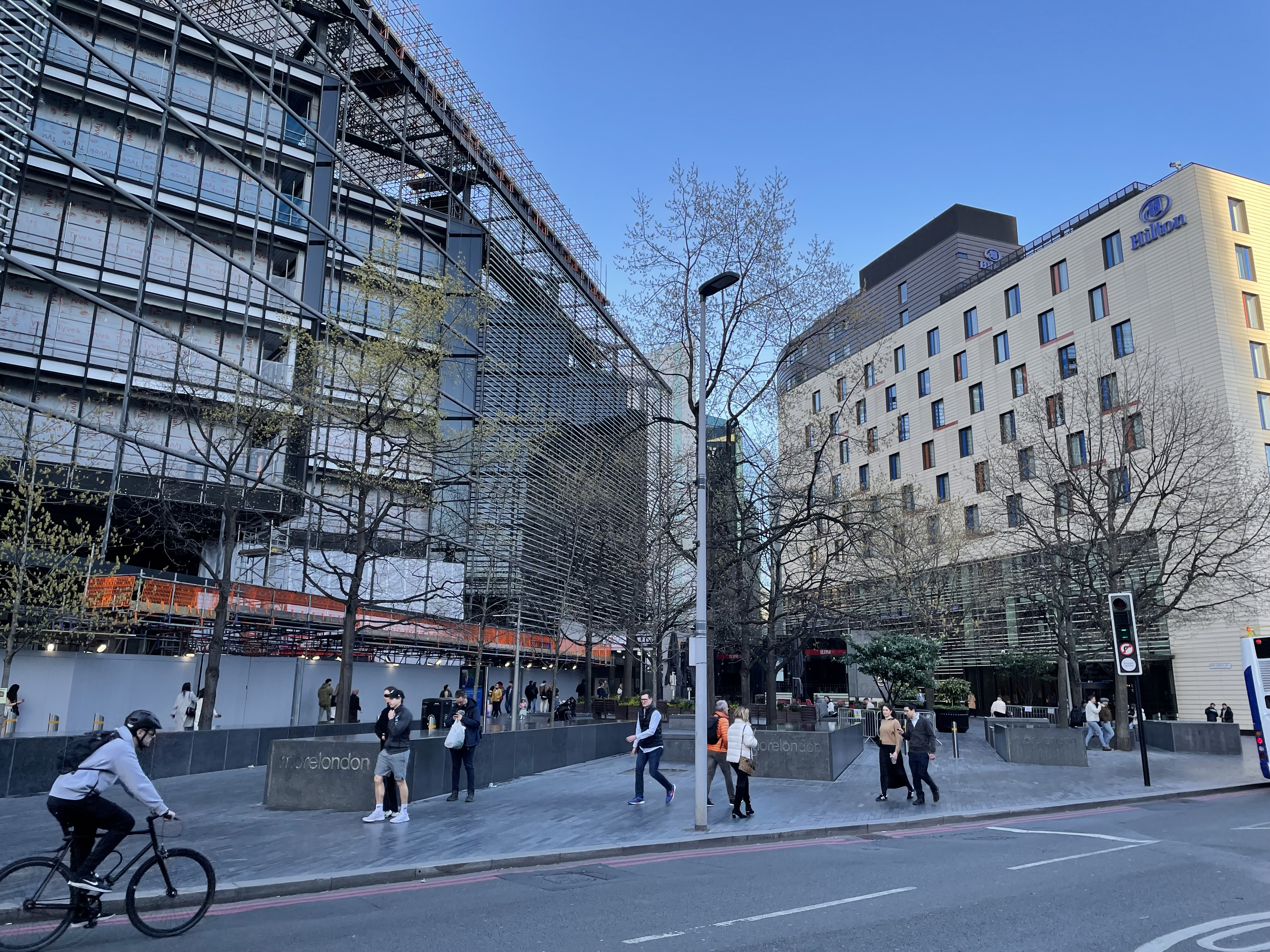
View of the More London Place from Tooley Street

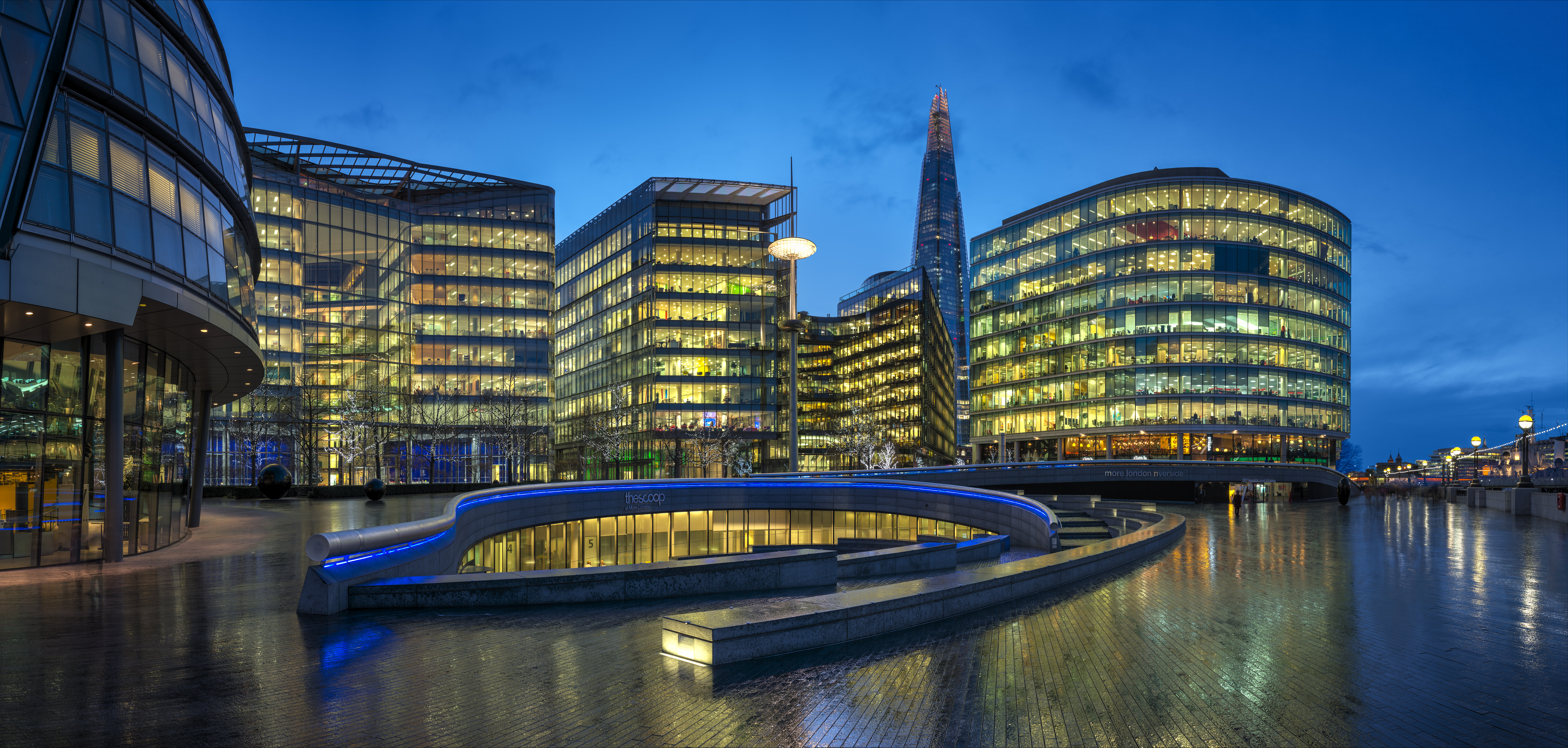
The More London development from City Hall on the Thames waterfront

More London, part of an area known as London Bridge City, is a development on the south bank of the River Thames, immediately south-west of Tower Bridge in London. It is owned by the Kuwaiti sovereign wealth fund.

It includes the former City Hall, a sunken amphitheatre called The Scoop, office blocks, shops, restaurants, cafes, and a pedestrianized area containing open-air sculptures and fountains lit by coloured lights. The Hilton London Tower Bridge hotel opened in September 2006.

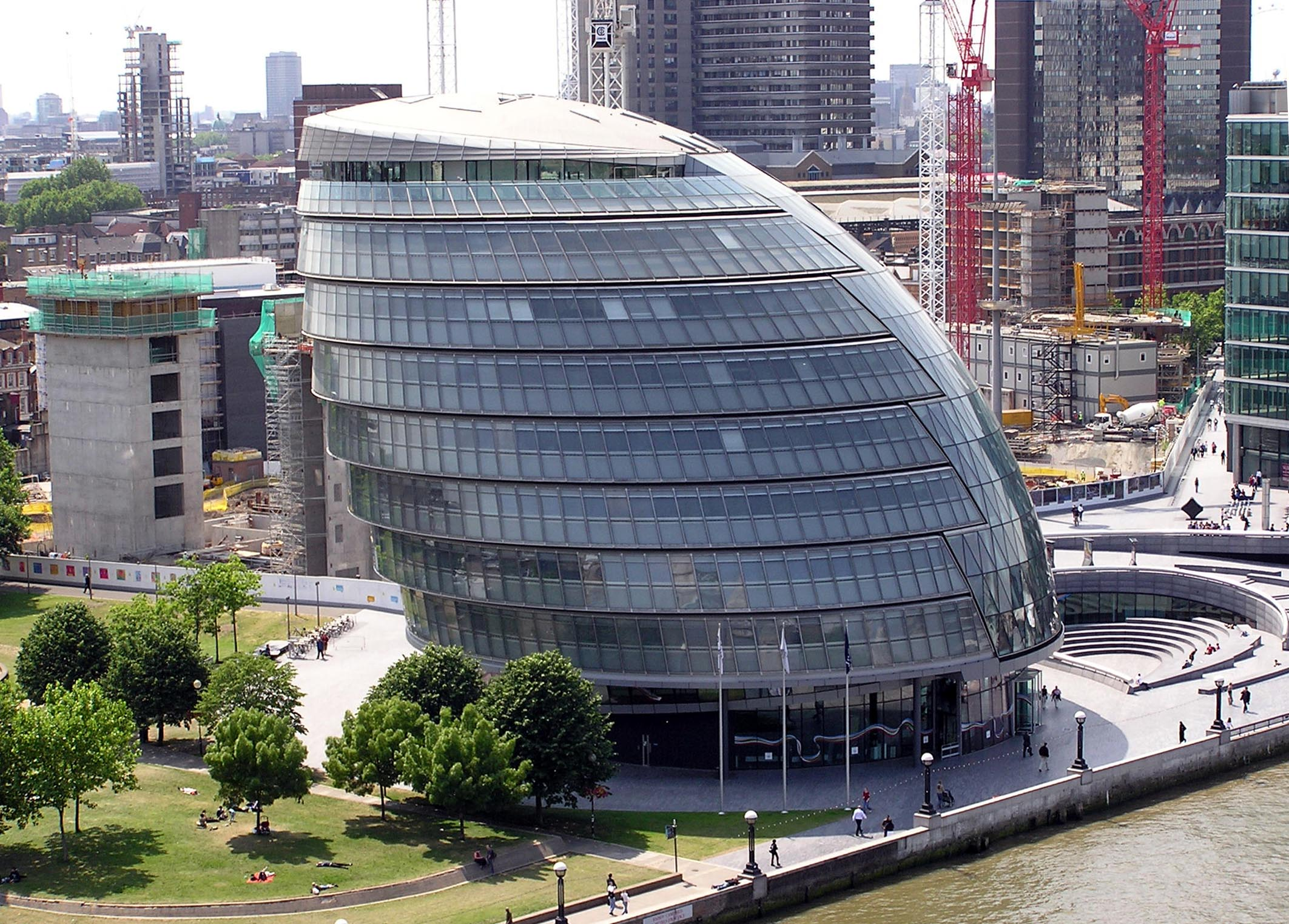
City Hall, showing the rest of the More London development under construction in the background

More London is 13 acres (53,000 m^{2}) in size and has planning consent for 3,000,000 square feet (280,000 m^{2}) of mixed use space, of which up to two million square feet will be offices, accommodating up to 20,000 people. The buildings were designed by Foster and Partners architects. The buildings are known as 1 & 6 More London Place, and 2, 3, 4 and 7 More London Riverside. The public area, which includes The Scoop, a fountain and planting areas, was designed by Townshend Landscape Architects.

There are frequently outdoor exhibitions and cultural events in More London. For most of 2005 there was a popular open-air exhibition of large environmental photographs called Earth from the Air.

In 2007, the development was shortlisted for the Carbuncle Cup architecture prize, an annual competition by Building Design for "the ugliest building in the United Kingdom completed in the last 12 months."

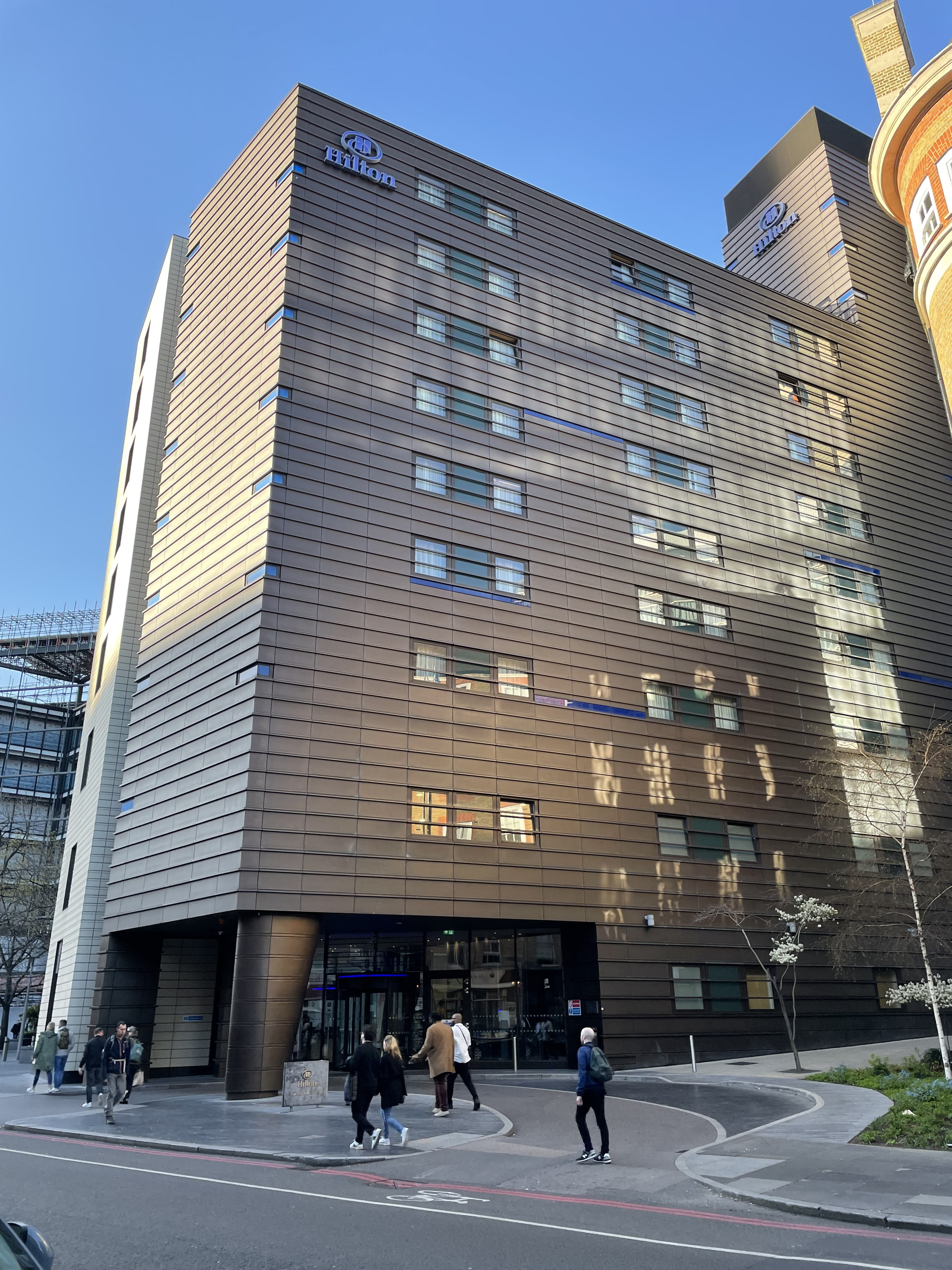
Hilton London Tower Bridge hotel

"The Rill", a brick water channel that ran along one walkway of the area, was filled in during 2018.

== Ownership ==
The site including its open spaces is owned by St Martins Property Group
