= The Scoop =

Amphitheatre in London

Coordinates: 51°30′18″N 0°4′45″W

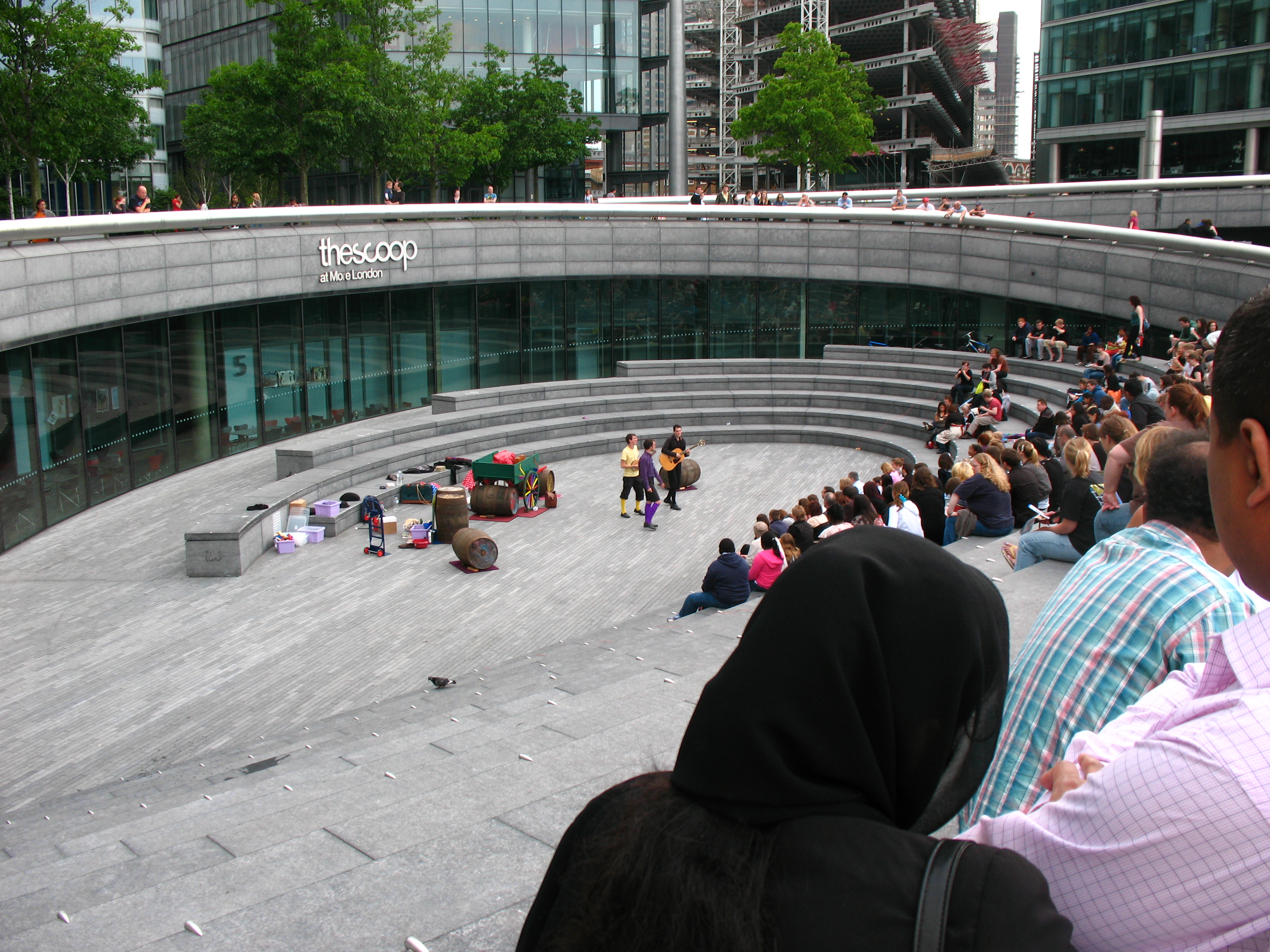
A performance at the Scoop

The Scoop is an outdoor amphitheatre situated on the south side of the River Thames near Tower Bridge in London, located next to City Hall, providing seating for approximately 800 people. Designed by Townshend Landscape Architects, it is a venue used during the summer to show films, musical performances and theatre productions by such companies as the Steam Industry and the Pantaloons. In June 2008, films shown at the Scoop included The Dam Busters, Atonement and Withnail and I. The Scoop has been used as a performance venue since 2002.
