= Albert Saloon =

The Albert Saloon (1843–1853) was a theatre based at Britannia Fields in the East End of London, England. It was also known as the Royal Albert Saloon, and the Royal Standard Tavern. Built of wood, the theatre was set in a garden and could be used both as an outdoor and indoor venue, as it had two stages, one of which faced the interior and the other the garden. The theatre hosted many performers of the day who went on to fame, such as Paul Herring (later a member of The Pantaloons) whose first hit, Imp of the Devil's Gorge was staged at the Albert Saloon, as well as Edward Edwards, who was well known in the 1830s and 1840s as a melodramatic actor.

Henry Brading managed the Albert Saloon from 1843–1850, and William Borrow from 1850–1852.
