= City Hall, London =

Headquarters of the Greater London Authority

City Hall
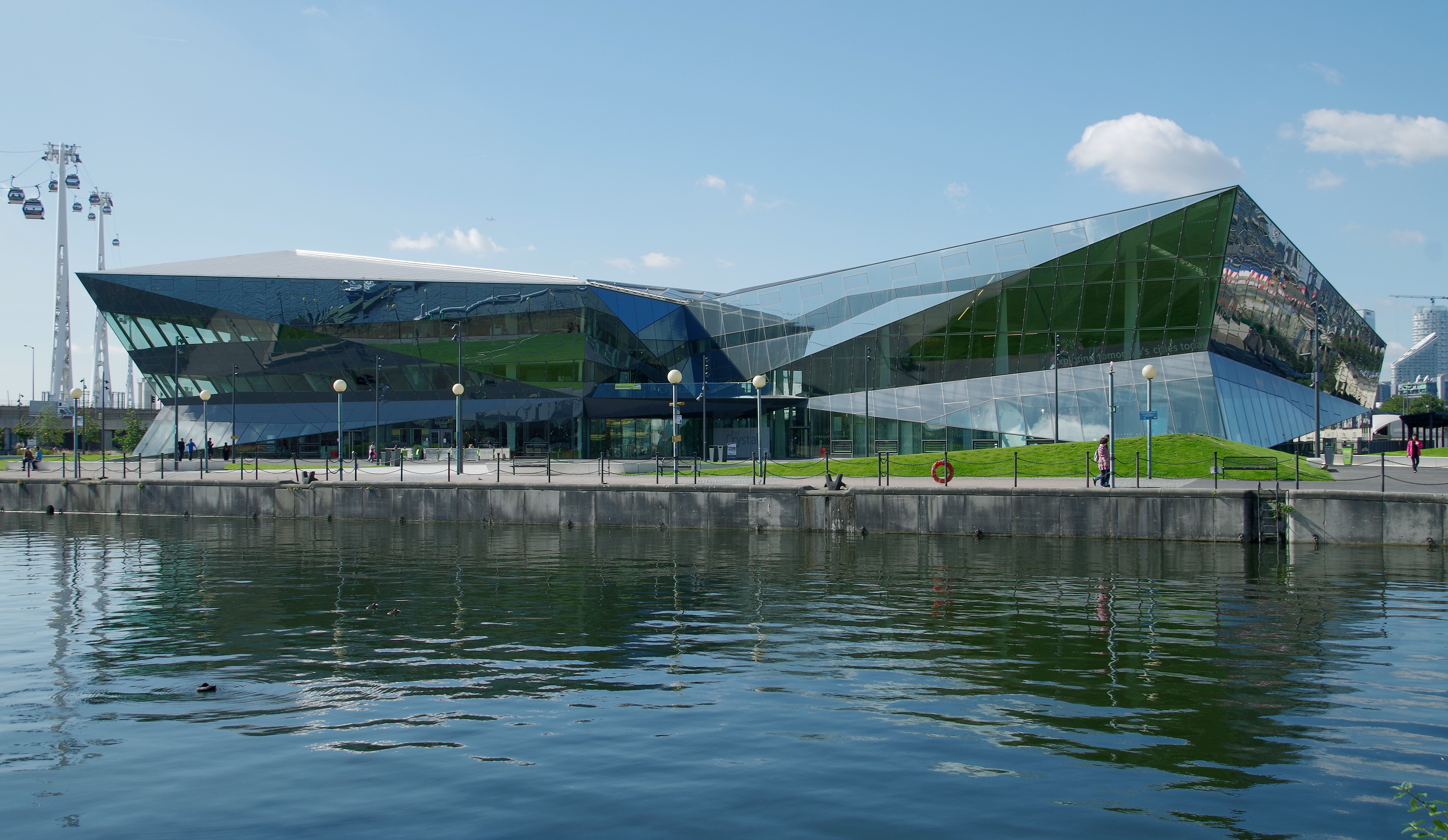
- City Hall seen across Royal Victoria Dock
- Interactive map of the City Hall area

General information
- Status: Completed
- Architectural style: Neo-futurism
- Location: Kamal Chunchie Way, Newham, London, E16 1ZE
- Coordinates: 51°30′27″N 0°0′58″E
- Construction started: March 2011
- Completed: July 2012
- Opening: September 2012 (repurposed as Greater London City Hall January 2022)
- Cost: £30 million
- Owner: Greater London Authority

Technical details
- Floor area: 7,000 m^{2} (75,000 sq ft)

Design and construction
- Architect: WilkinsonEyre
- Structural engineer: Arup Group
- Services engineer: Arup Group
- Main contractor: ISG

City Hall, in the London Borough of Newham in east London, is the headquarters of the Greater London Authority (GLA), the regional government for Greater London. It replaced the previous City Hall, in Southwark in 2022. The building opened in 2012 and was previously an exhibition centre for sustainable architecture, known as The Crystal. Built and opened by Siemens, it was the first building in the world to reach the highest sustainability award levels in LEED and BREEAM. It was bought by the GLA in 2019 for the London Docklands redevelopment project.

The building is situated next to the redeveloped Royal Victoria Dock in Canning Town. The northern terminus of the London cable car, and Royal Victoria station, the Docklands Light Railway and Custom House railway station on the Elizabeth line are within walking distance. It is close to London City Airport.

== History ==
=== Exhibition and conference centre ===
The Crystal was built as a key part of the Green Enterprise District policy of the London Development Agency.

The building was designed by Perkins+Will (fit-out, design leader) and Wilkinson Eyre Architects (shell and core), with Arup Group who were the building and civil engineers, and Townshend Landscape Architects who designed the public realm. Event Communications were the exhibition designers, responsible for the interpretive planning, exhibition design and creative direction, graphic design, media direction and construction management for the exhibition spaces. The building was the first to achieve the highest sustainable building accolades, platinum and outstanding respectively, from the world's two leading accreditation bodies, LEED and BREEAM.

When it opened, the Crystal contained a permanent exhibition about sustainable development, and was owned and operated by Siemens. In 2016, Siemens sold the building to the GLA, who acquired it to use as a base for the Mayor of London's £3.5bn project to regenerate the Royal Docks. After Siemens vacated the building in 2019, it was used by the Royal Docks regeneration team but large parts of the building remained empty.

=== City Hall ===
In June 2020, the Mayor of London Sadiq Khan announced that he was consulting on relocating the headquarters of the GLA from City Hall in Southwark to The Crystal in order to save £55 million for the GLA over the course of five years. The decision was confirmed on 3 November 2020; Newham Borough Council gave permission for a change of use for the building in December 2020. The move was completed in the third week of January 2022, delayed from the previous planned opening date in December 2021. The building was renamed "City Hall" in December 2021.

== Architecture ==
The entire site is 18,000 square metres (190,000 sq ft) in size and the surrounding landscape was designed to be a sustainable urban landscape to help encourage a shift in the social ideology, making 'sustainability' more attractive and allowing people to participate in social activities within the site, which includes local food programmes and community gardens to help foster this principle.

The building contains a number of sustainable technologies, including the building management system and KNX infrastructure. The building control devices, such as lighting, windows, blinds and heating, are connected using the KNX protocol. The building has over 2,500 KNX connected devices.

== Gallery ==
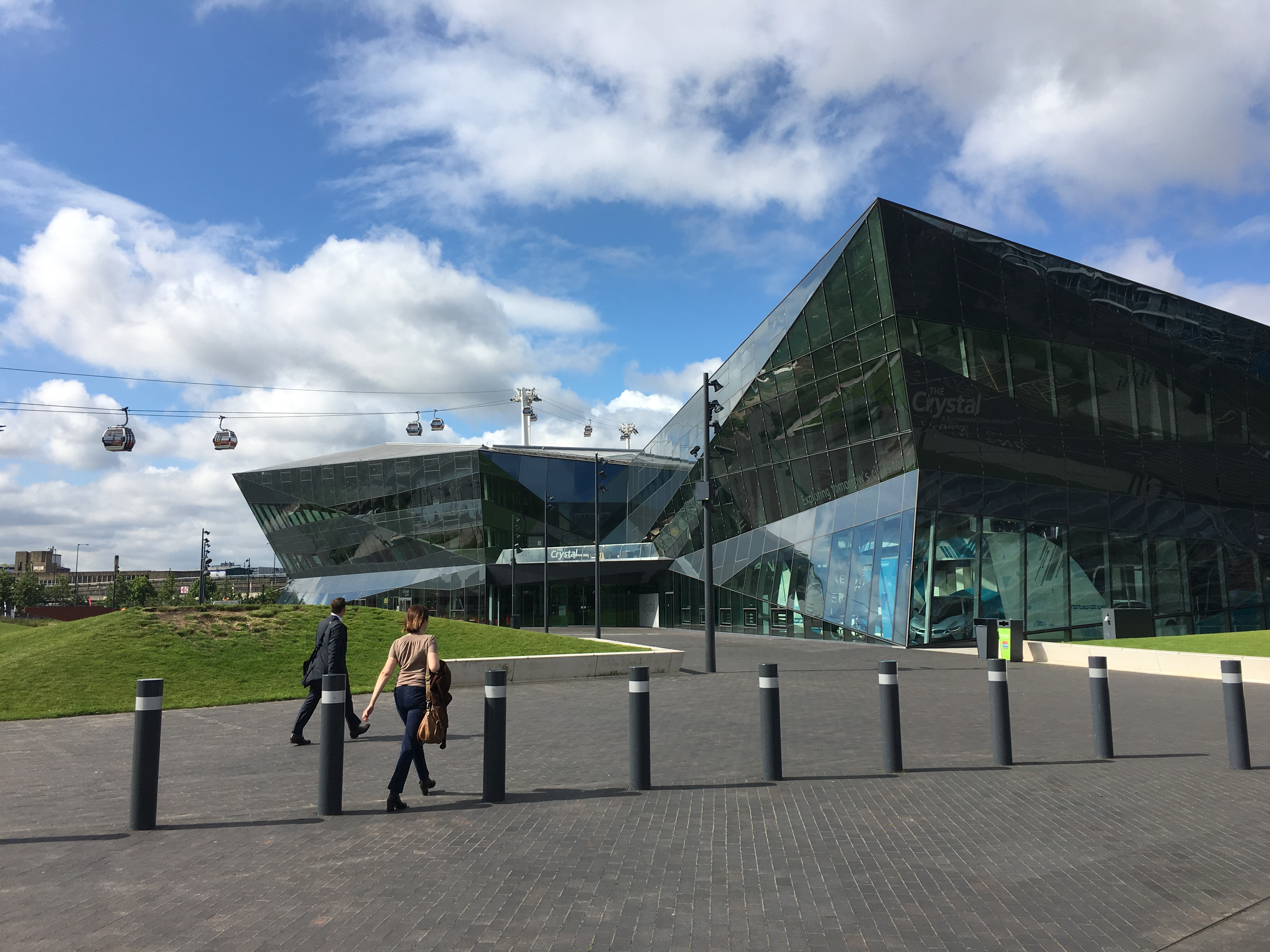
A close-up view of the building

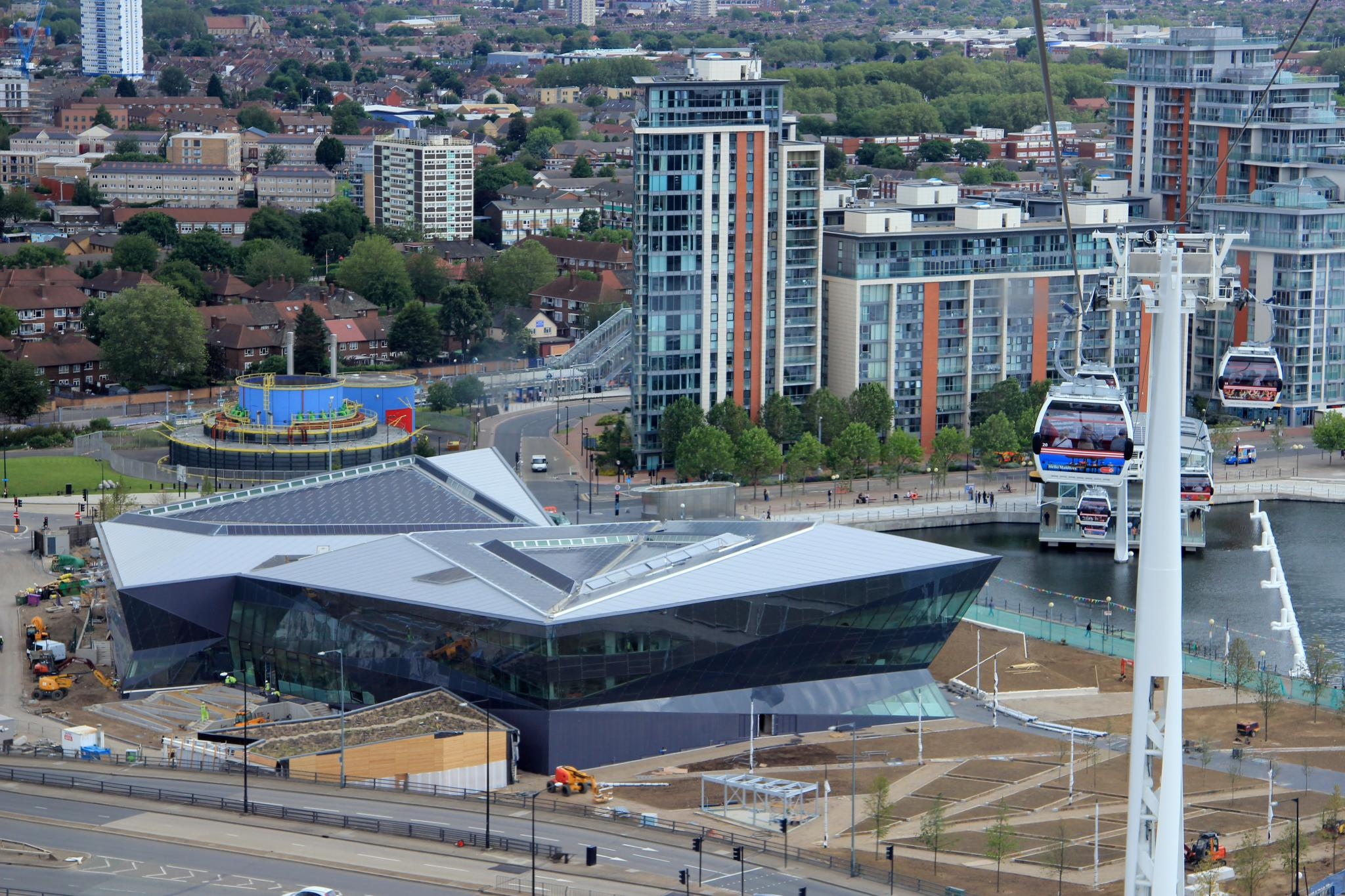
Aerial view

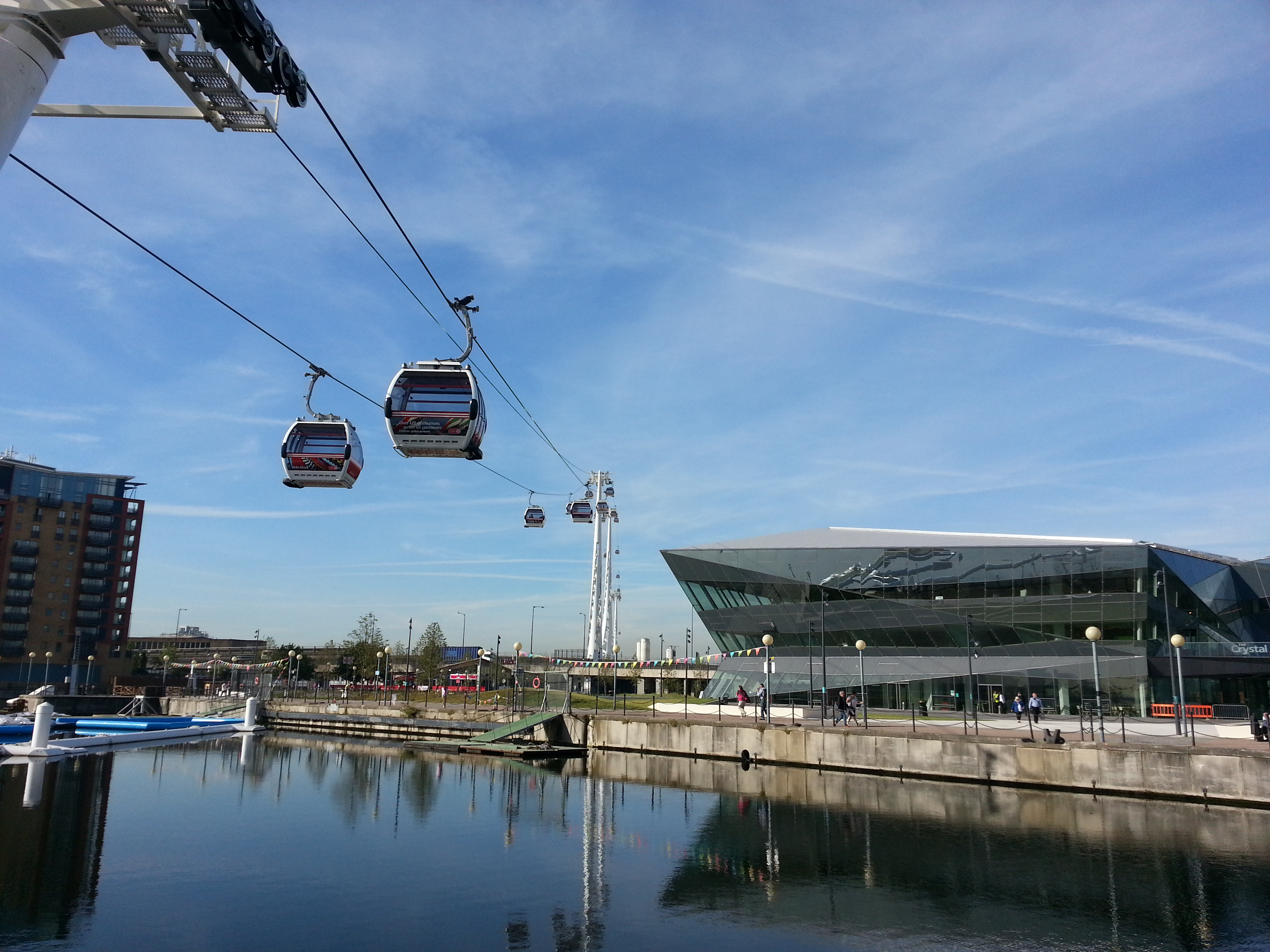
View from the London cable car

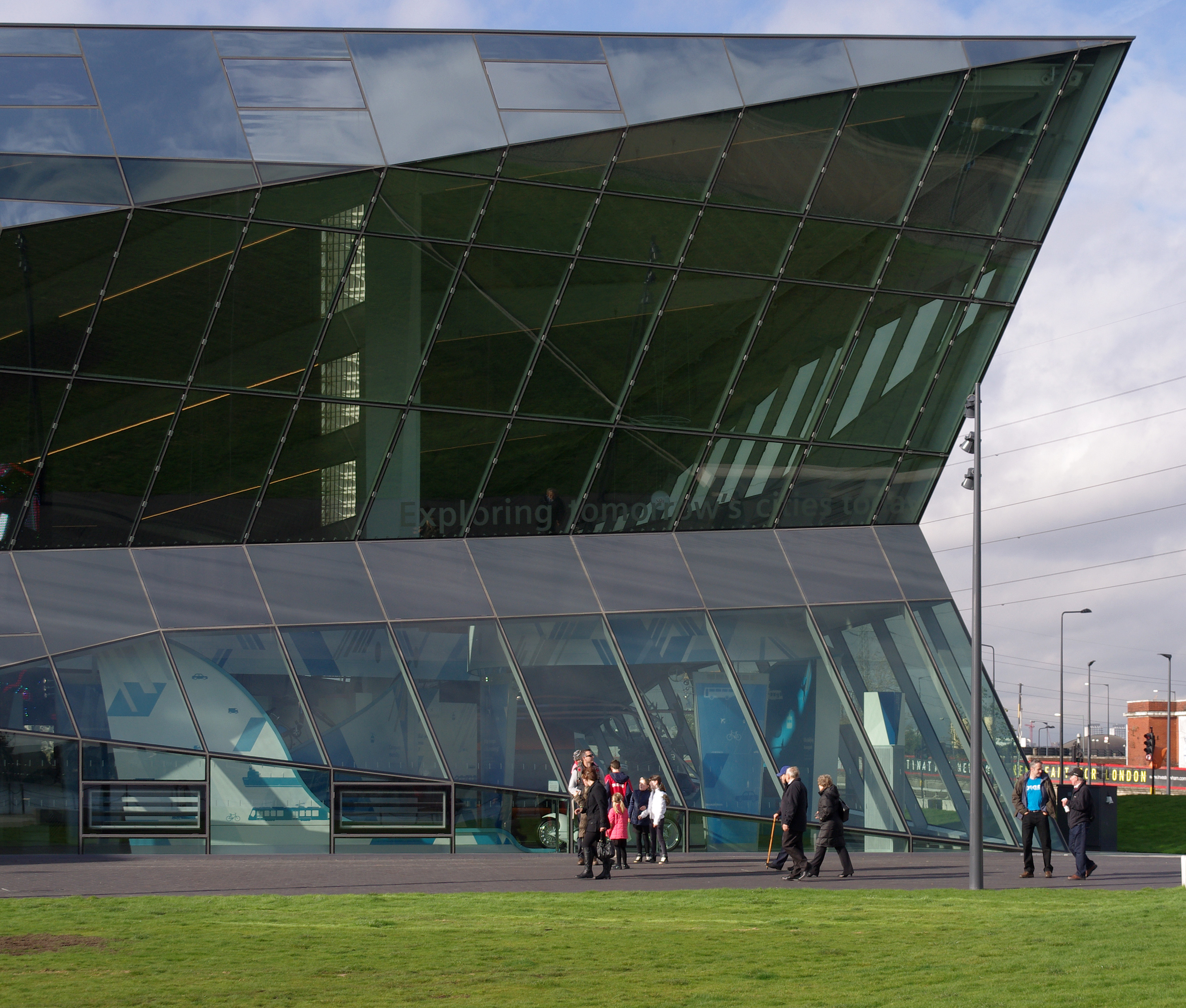
Glass panels

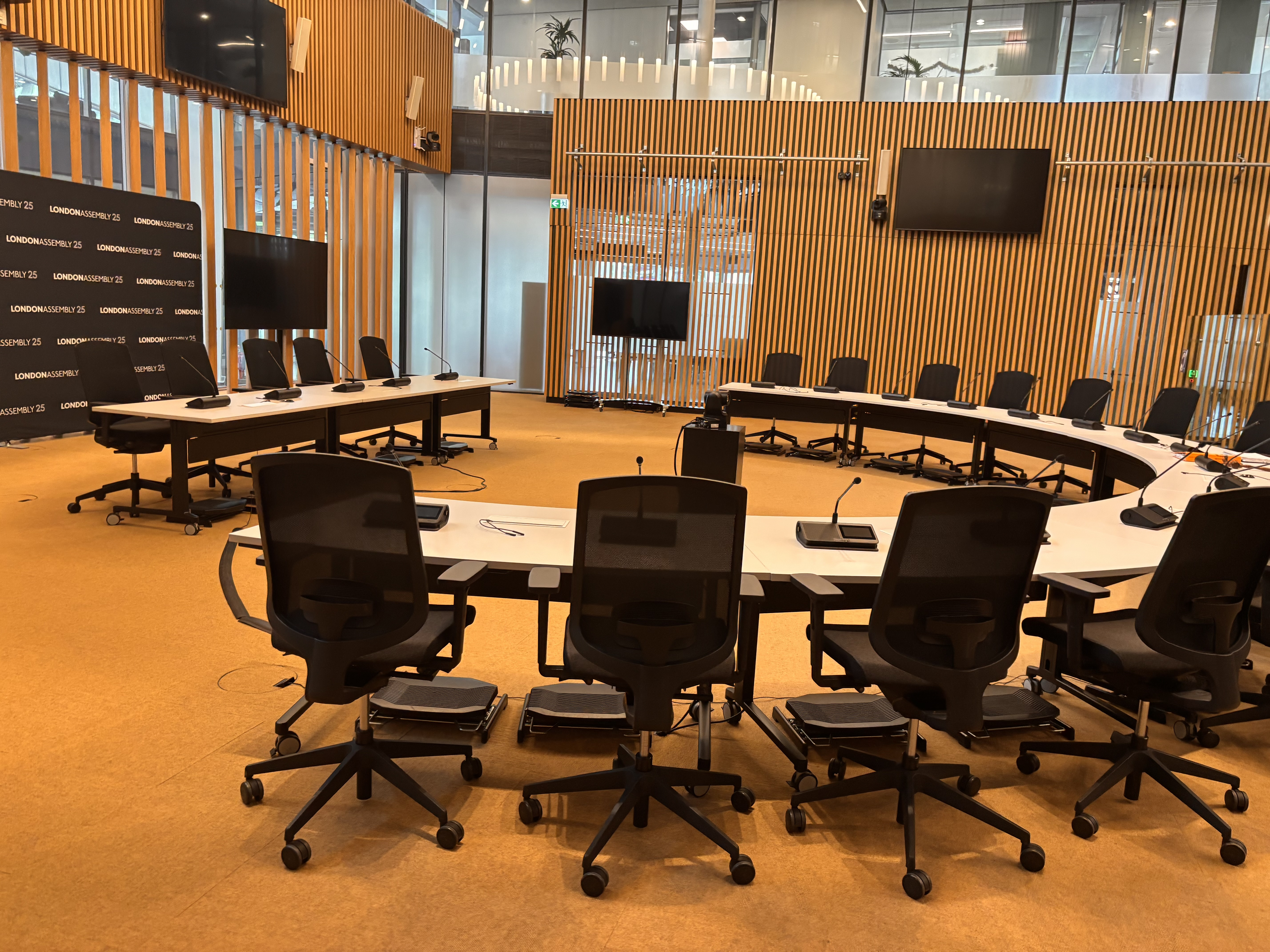
London Assembly chamber

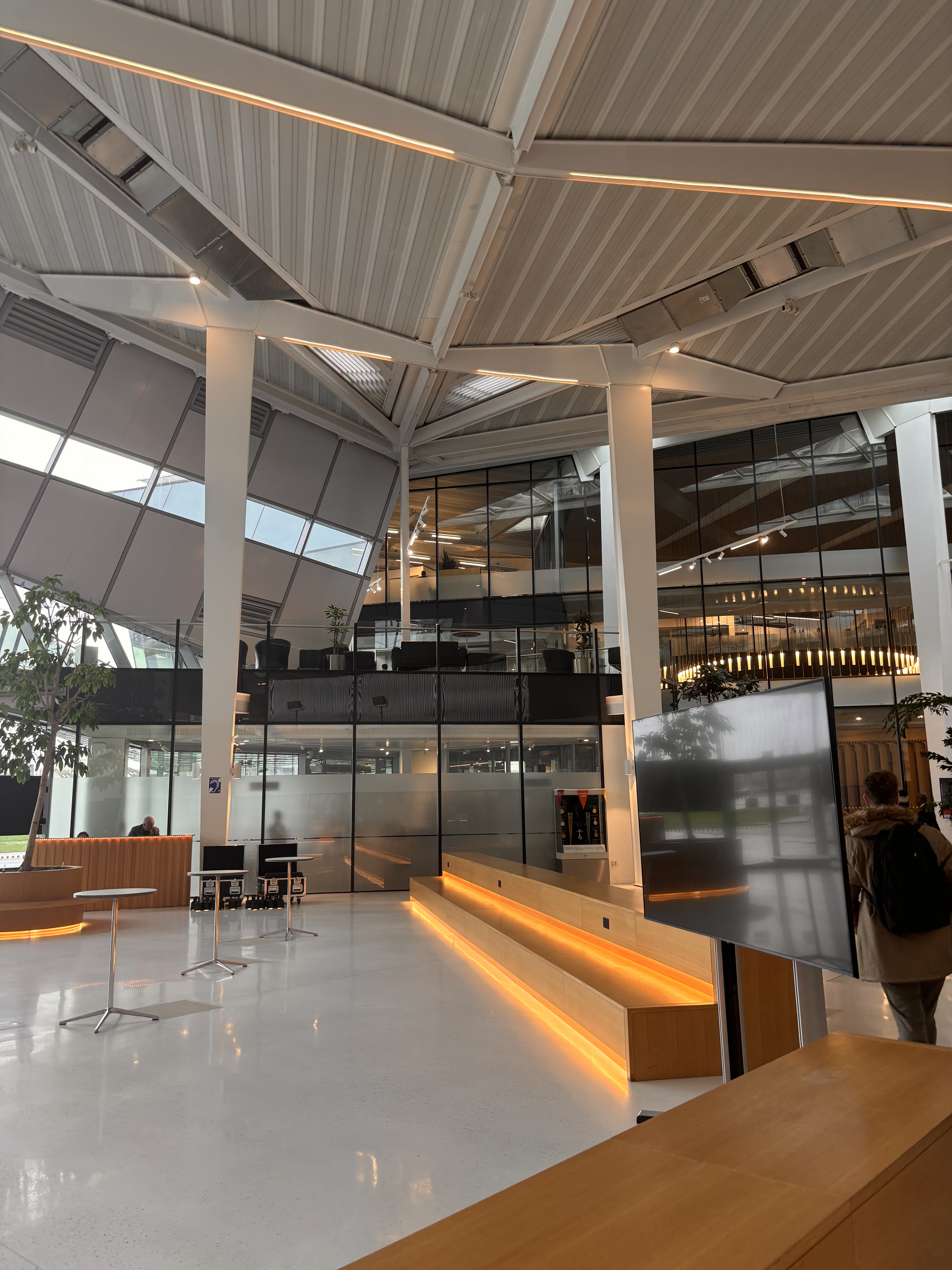
Lobby

== See also ==
- Westminster City Hall
- Guildhall, London
- County Hall, London
