= Earth from the Air =

Book by Yann Arthus-Bertrand

- Author: Yann Arthus-Bertrand
- Language: English
- Genre: Photography

Earth from the Air is a popular collection of environmental photographs taken from the air by Yann Arthus-Bertrand. They have been published in a number of books together with text describing environmental concerns related to the photographs.

Large format versions of many of the photographs have also been exhibited in various cities. In London they were on display outside the Natural History Museum; and were subsequently exhibited outside City Hall for most of 2005, together with a giant world map on the ground showing where each photograph was taken.
