= Bishops Square =

Coordinates: 51.5195°N 0.0776°W

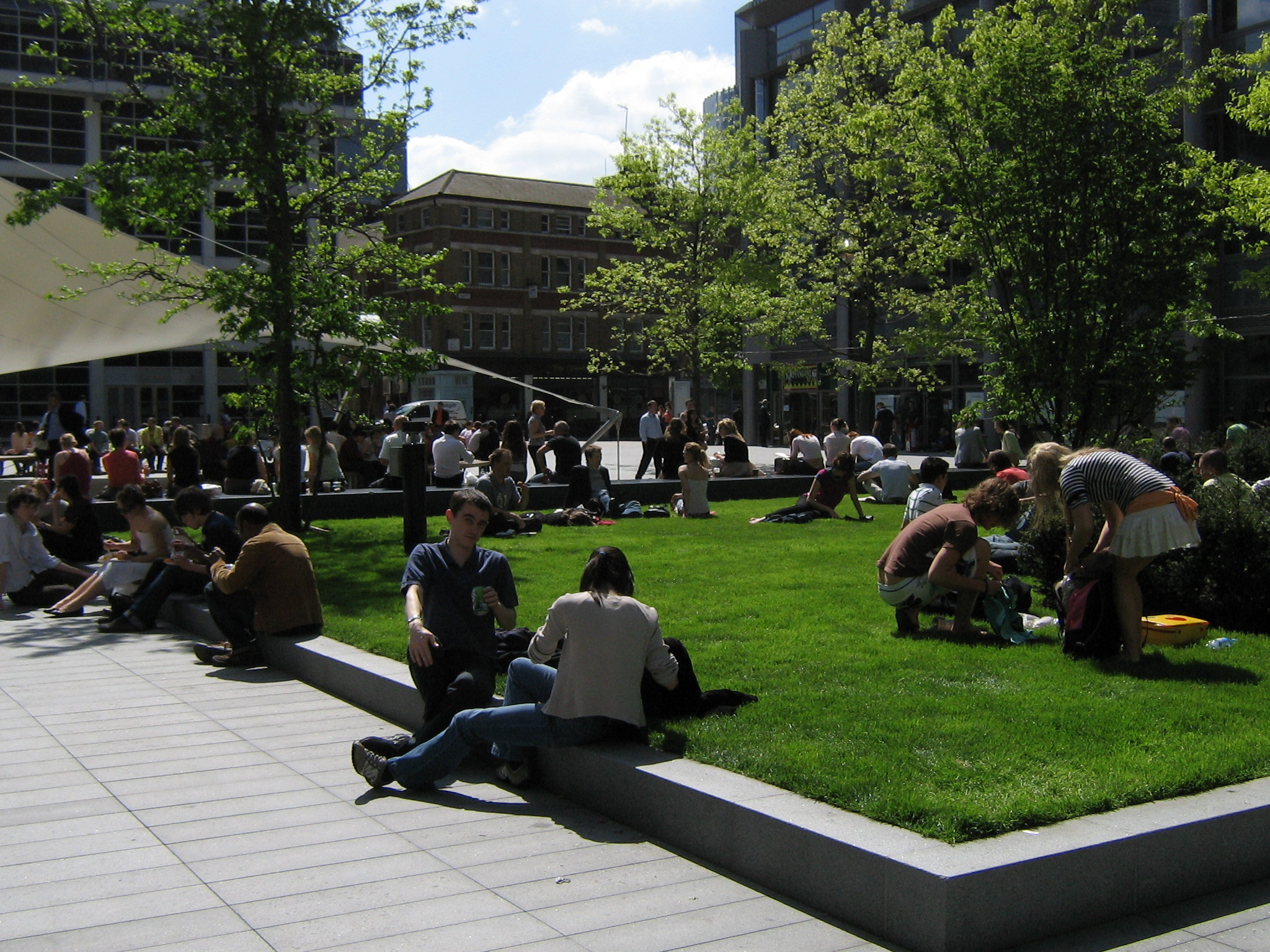
Bishops Square in Spitalfields

Bishops Square is a large commercial property development in the Spitalfields area of London, England. Previously owned by Hammerson, and later jointly by Hammerson and the Oman Investment Fund, it is now owned by JP Morgan. It has been cited as an example of a privately owned public space in London.

The headquarters of global law firm, Allen & Overy, are located at One Bishops Square.
