= Privately owned public space =

Legally open non-governmental property

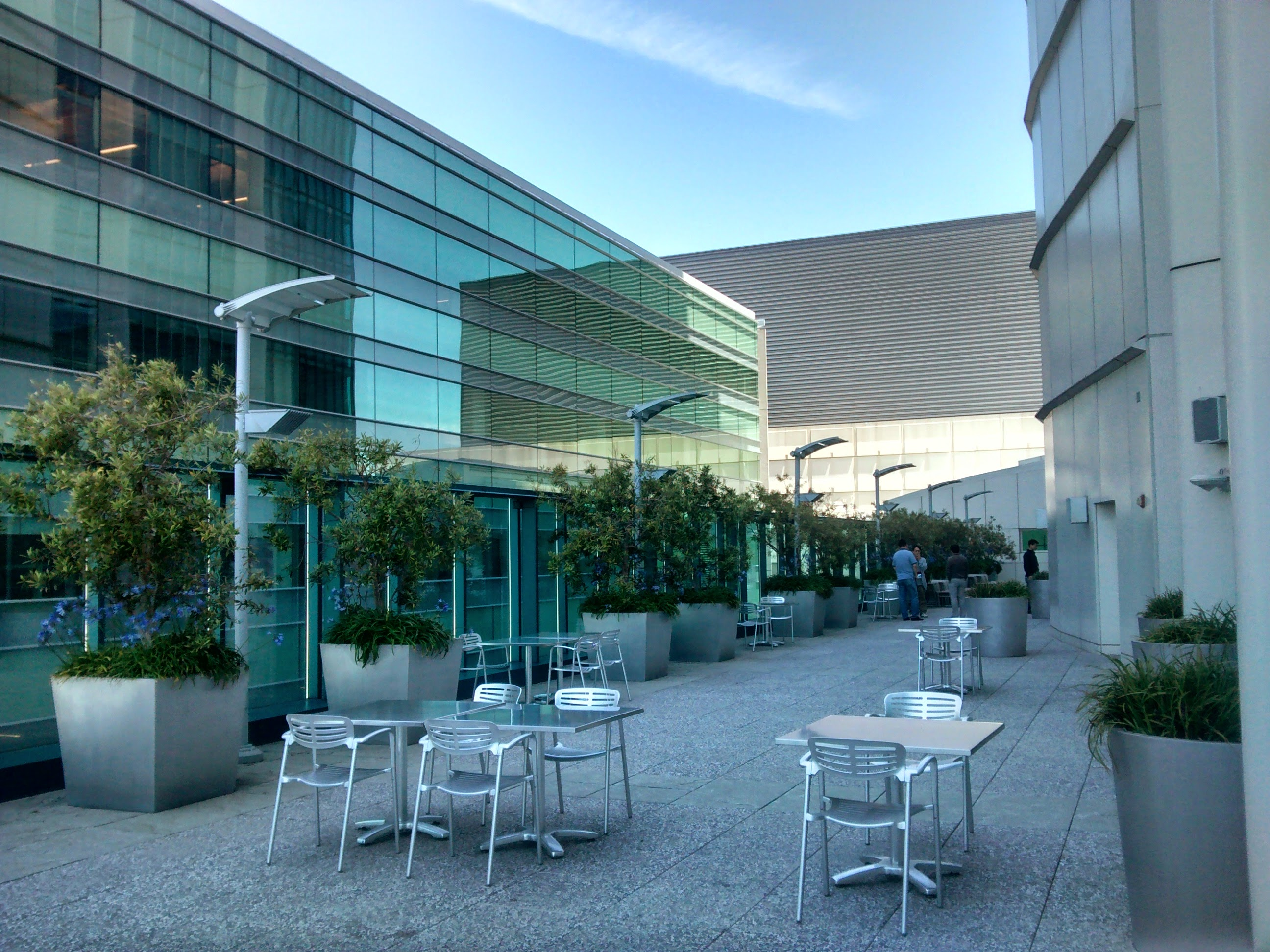
The terrace of the Intercontinental Hotel in San Francisco, California, a privately owned public space

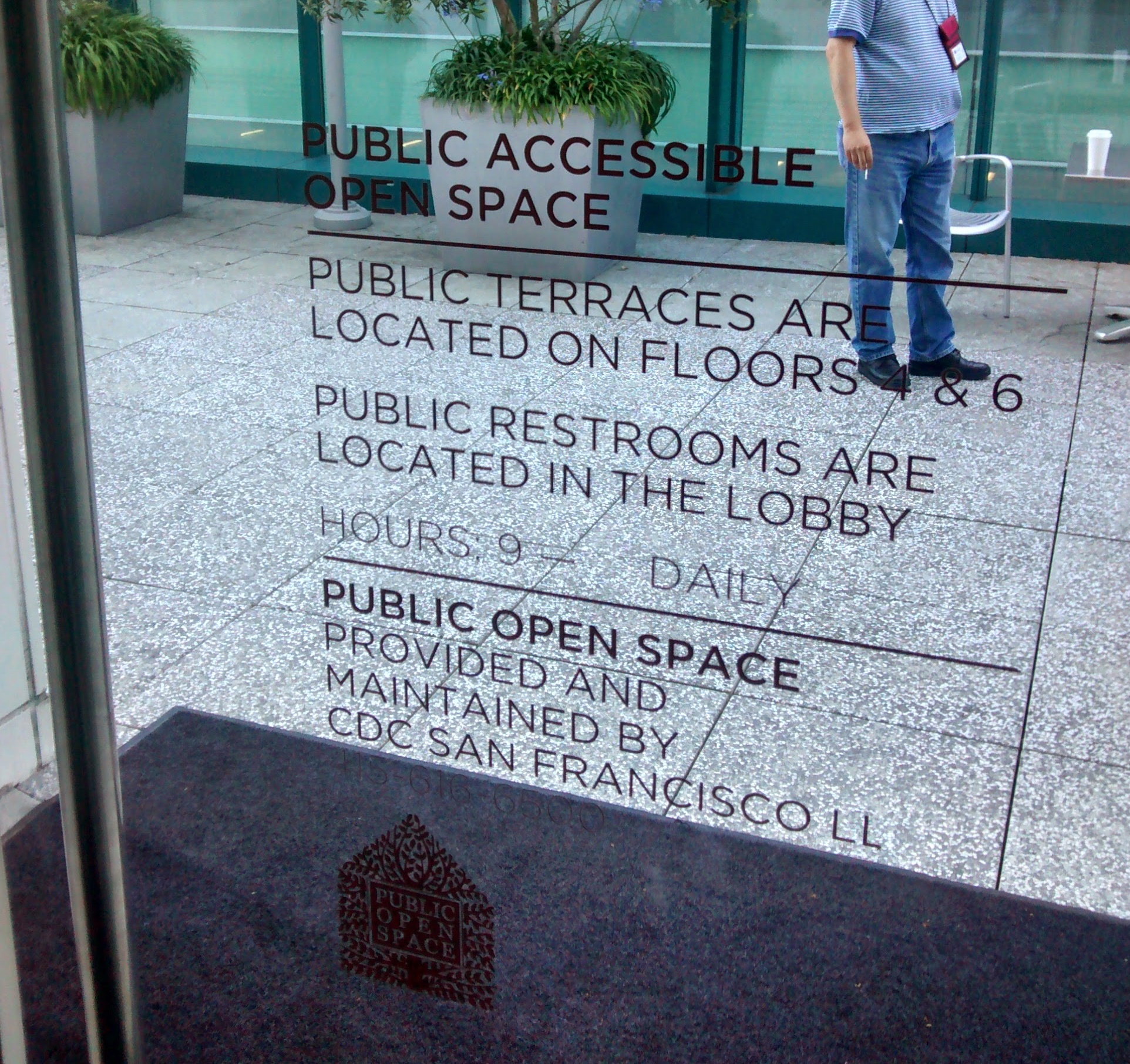
The sign to the terrace of the Intercontinental Hotel in San Francisco, California, a privately owned public space

Privately owned public space (POPS), or alternatively, privately owned public open spaces (POPOS), are terms used to describe a type of public space that, although privately owned, is legally required to be open to the public under a city's zoning ordinance or other land-use law. The acronym POPOS is preferentially used over POPS on the west coast of the US. Both terms can be used to represent either a singular or plural space or spaces. These spaces are usually the product of a deal between cities and private real estate developers in which cities grant valuable zoning concessions and developers provide in return privately owned public spaces in or near their buildings.

Privately owned public spaces may include walkways, plazas, arcades, small parks, and atriums, and are largely determined by where the property lot-line was initially drawn. Depending on the law, they may be marked with public dedication plaques and signage. Many cities worldwide, including Auckland, New York City, San Francisco, Dublin, Seattle, Seoul, and Toronto, have privately owned public spaces.

== History ==
The term privately owned public space was popularized by Harvard professor Jerold S. Kayden through his 2000 book Privately Owned Public Space: The New York City Experience, written in collaboration with the New York City Department of City Planning and the Municipal Art Society of New York. It attributed this type of public space to a "legal innovation" introduced in 1961 in New York City, an "incentive zoning" mechanism offering developers the right to build 10 square feet of bonus rentable or sellable floor area in return for one square foot of plaza, and three square feet of bonus floor area in return for one square foot of arcade.

Between 1961 and 2000, 503 privately owned public spaces, scattered almost entirely in downtown, midtown, and upper east and west sides of New York City's borough of Manhattan, were constructed at 320 buildings. The book cited the quantitative success of the program's public space production but reported that 41 percent of these spaces were of "marginal" quality and roughly 50 percent of buildings had one or more spaces apparently out of compliance with applicable legal requirements resulting in privatization.

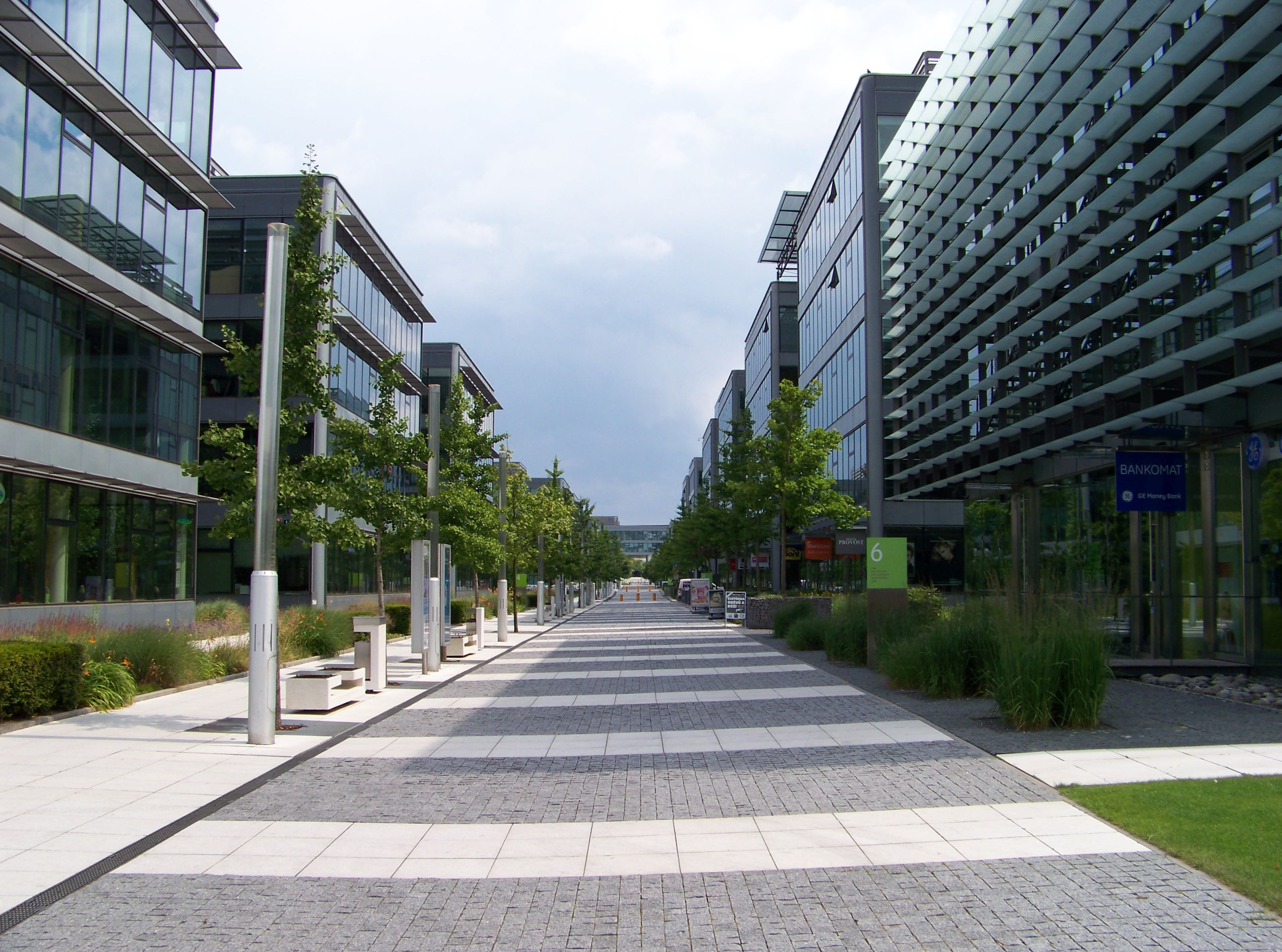
Privately owned public pedestrian zone in The Park office district in Prague, Czech Republic

While privately owned public space as a term of art refers specifically to private property required to be usable by the public under zoning or similar regulatory arrangements, the phrase in its broadest sense can refer to places, like shopping malls and hotel lobbies, that are privately owned and open to the public, even if they are not legally required to be open to the public.

=== London ===
In 2017, The Guardian published a study of the phenomenon in London, facing a lack of response from both landowners and local authorities they questioned on the subject. In reaction to the report, the Mayor of London, Sadiq Khan promised to publish new guidelines on how these spaces are governed.

By 2021, the Mayor's proposed "public London charter", announced in 2017, had been formalised as the Public London Charter London Plan Guidance: the Mayor approved it for adoption in September 2021 and it was adopted on 8 October 2021.

Linked to London Plan Policy D8, the charter sets out principles for the management of new public spaces and requires planning applicants providing new public space to submit a management plan that would publicly (Note: Planning applications in the UK are public information.) list, among other things, restrictions that the owner intends to impose. These principles cannot be retroactively enforced on existing spaces, though owners of the spaces can voluntarily implement the standards of the charter. Among other principles (such as free and unrestricted lawful use), public spaces in compliance with this charter should be signposted with information about who owns and manages the space, and the rules that apply to its use.

== See also ==
- Fourth and Madison Building
- List of privately owned public spaces in London
- List of privately owned public spaces in New York City
- List of privately owned public spaces in San Francisco
- Private protected area
- Privatization
- The Social Life of Small Urban Spaces
