= The Pantaloons =

- The Pantaloons logo
- Formation: 2004
- Type: Theatre group
- Purpose: comedy, open air, Shakespeare
- Location: United Kingdom
- Artistic director(s): Steve Purcell, Caitlin Storey, Mark Hayward
- Notable members: Christopher Smart, Ross Drury, Edward Ferrow, Martin Gibbons, Kelly Griffiths, Neil Jennings, Alex Rivers, Chris Coxon,
- Website: http://thepantaloons.co.uk

The Pantaloons are an English touring theatre company specialising in open-air productions of the plays of William Shakespeare. Their work draws from a wide variety of popular theatre traditions, and is often performed for free in public spaces.

== History ==
The Pantaloons were founded in 2004 at the University of Kent, performing an all-male, open-air production of As You Like It in Canterbury, Kent. They regrouped the following year for a small-scale tour of The Winter's Tale, which involved their first free performances at the Edinburgh Festival Fringe. The scale of their tours has increased since then, and the company now tour extensively across the UK.

The Pantaloons have produced a variety of free performances every year since 2005 in public spaces such as The Scoop, London, Preston Park, Brighton, and the Royal Botanic Garden Edinburgh.

Since their foundation, the company have performed:

- As You Like It (2004)
- The Winter's Tale (2005)
- Romeo and Juliet (2006, 2009 and 2016)
- Cymbeline (2006)
- A Midsummer Night's Dream (2007 and 2013)
- The Taming of the Shrew (2008)
- Twelfth Night (2009)
- Much Ado About Nothing (2010 and 2015)
- Macbeth (2010)
- A Christmas Carol (2010, 2011 and 2012)
- The Canterbury Tales (2011, 2012 and 2016)
- The Importance of Being Earnest (2012 and 2016)
- Grimm Fairy Tales (2012)
- Sherlock Holmes (2013 and 2014)
- The Tempest (2014)
- The Pantaloons' History of Britain (2014)
- Bleak House (2014 and 2015)
- Pride and Prejudice (2015)
- Treasure Island (2015)
- Gulliver's Travels (2016)
- Pride and Prejudice (2017)
- A Midsummer Night's Dream (2017)
- The War of the Worlds (2018) and (2022)
- As You Like It (2018).

The company began to attract national attention with their 2008 production of The Taming of the Shrew, with coverage in The Guardian and Independent newspapers focusing largely on their free shows and family appeal. Their Romeo and Juliet was listed by The Sunday Times in 2009 as one of their picks for the summer.

As of 2015, the company also give school workshops on Shakespeare for Key Stages 2, 3 and 4.

== Recorded media ==
The Covid-19 pandemic forced the early closure of their 2020 theatre tour of Bleak House. To recoup lost box-office revenue, they adapted the show into a radio play and a crowdfunding model was adopted to finance the venture. This is The Pantaloons' only full length show available in a recorded medium.

The play was adapted for radio and directed by Alex Rivers, while audio production and editing was by Chris Coxon. The cast were Edward Ferrow, Alex Rivers, Emily Beach, Neil Jennings and Chris Coxon.
