= 110 The Queen's Walk =

Former headquarters of the Greater London Authority

Coordinates: 51°30′17.26″N 0°4′43.13″W

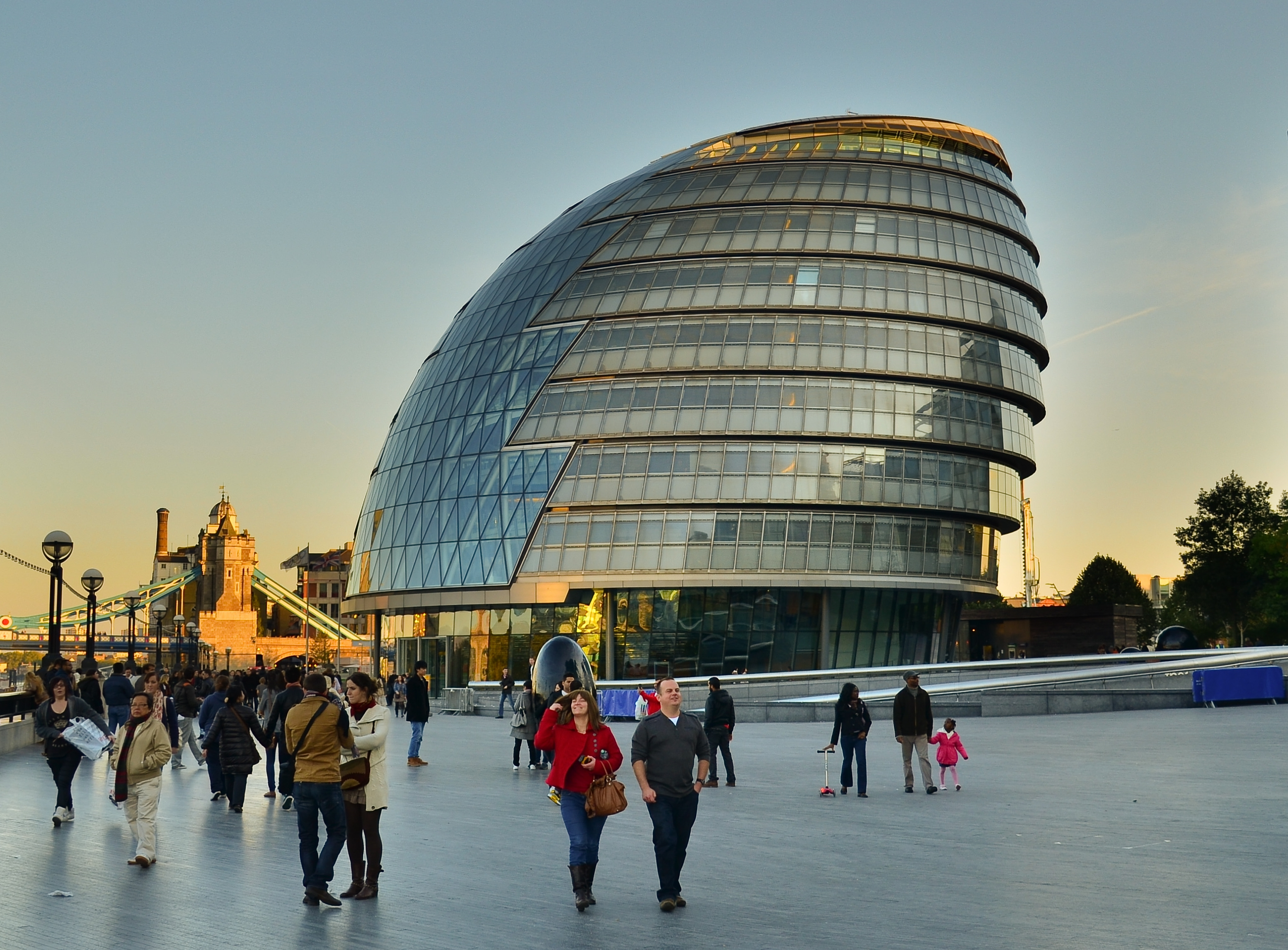
- The former City Hall building pictured in 2011

- Location within Central London
- Former names: City Hall

General information
- Architectural style: Neo-futurism
- Location: 110 The Queen's Walk; London, England
- Current tenants: None
- Completed: July 2002; 24 years ago
- Owner: Kuwait Investment Authority

Height
- Height: 45 metres (147.6 ft)

Design and construction
- Architect: Norman Foster
- Architecture firm: Foster + Partners
- Structural engineer: Arup

110 The Queen's Walk, formerly City Hall, is a building in Bermondsey, London, that served as the headquarters of the Greater London Authority (GLA) between July 2002 and December 2021. It is undergoing partial demolition and reconstruction. Originally, designed by Norman Foster, it is located on the south bank of the River Thames near Tower Bridge. The site, which forms part of the More London development, has been owned by the State of Kuwait since 2013.

In June 2020, Mayor of London Sadiq Khan proposed a relocation of the GLA to The Crystal, a GLA-owned property in Newham. Khan confirmed the decision on 3 November 2020 and the GLA vacated City Hall on 2 December 2021.

== History ==
The City Hall building was designed by Norman Foster and was constructed at a cost of £43 million on a site formerly occupied by wharves serving the Pool of London. It opened in July 2002, two years after the GLA was created, and was leased rather than owned by the GLA. Despite its name, City Hall did not serve a city (according to UK law). It had responsibilities over Greater London, which should not be confused with the City of London, which has its headquarters at the Guildhall.

In June 2011, Mayor Boris Johnson announced that for the duration of the London 2012 Olympic Games, the building would be called London House.

In November 2020, Mayor of London Sadiq Khan announced plans to vacate City Hall at the end of 2021 and relocate to The Crystal in the Royal Victoria Docks area of East London. Khan cited the high cost of rent as the reason for relocating the GLA headquarters, stating that vacating City Hall in favour of a property owned by the authority would save it £55 million over the course of five years.

In 2023, the St Martins Property Group announced that the architectural firms of Gensler and LDA Design had completed a plan to redesign the unused structure as a mixed-use office and retail building. It was intended to replace the iconic spiral with leafy terraces and replace the glazing with different materials. The proposals were approved by Southwark Council in December 2024. Around 3,800 square metres (41,000 sq ft) of floor space – 452 square metres (4,870 sq ft) of office space and 3,300 square metres (36,000 sq ft) of retail space – would be added to the building, following straightening of the slant on its southern side, extending the footprint of the building by 14.2m. The Twentieth Century Society added the building to its Risk List of architecture at risk of being lost in 2021.

As of October 2025, the building was undergoing major demolition and refurbishment works to accommodate office and retail space, retaining the core of the building, but straightening its distinctive leaning profile.

== Design ==
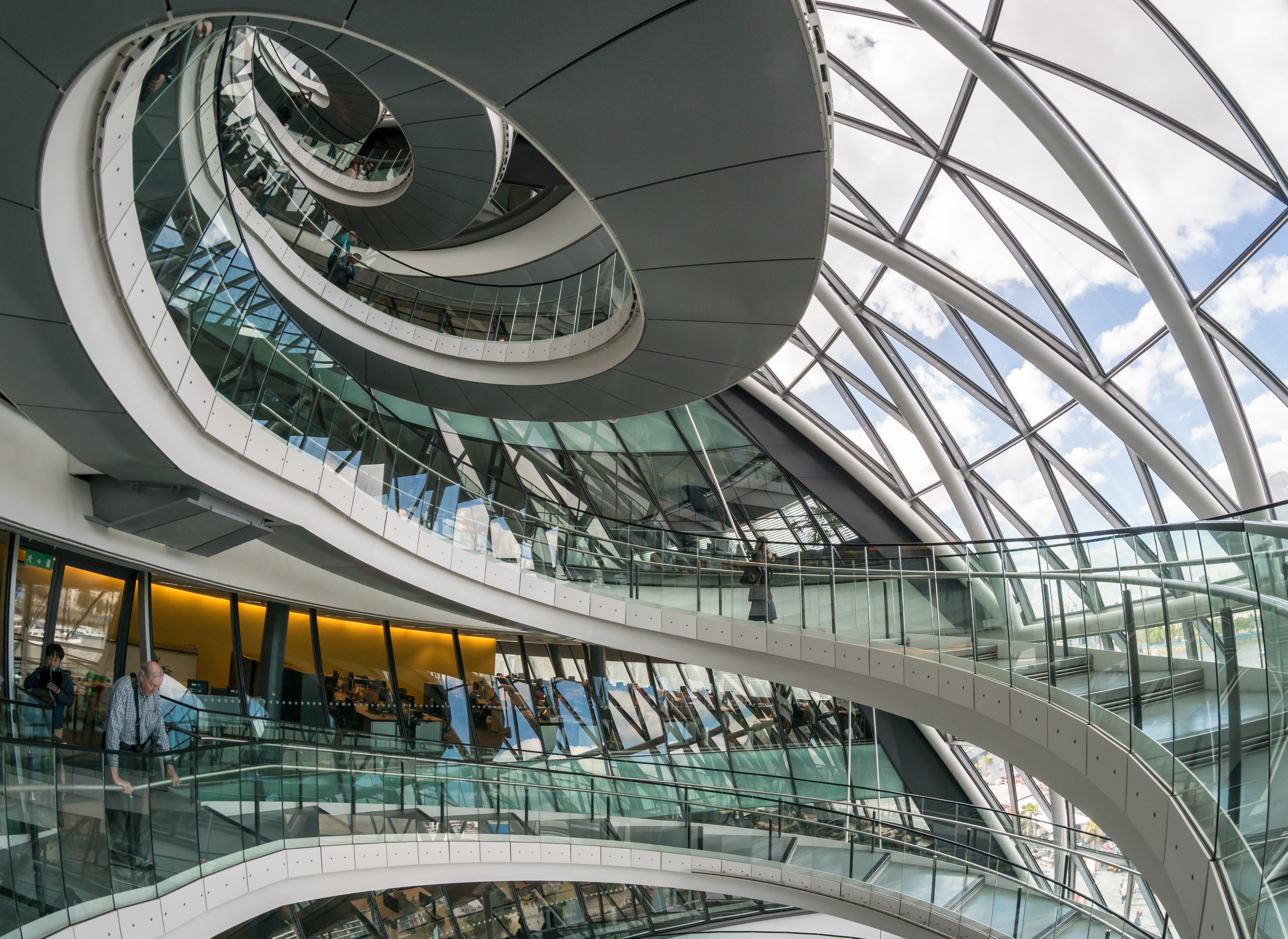
The interior helical staircase of City Hall

The building has an unusual, bulbous shape, purportedly intended to reduce its surface area and thus improve energy efficiency, although the excess energy consumption caused by the exclusive use of glass (in a double façade) overwhelms the benefit of shape. Despite claiming the building "demonstrates the potential for a sustainable, virtually non-polluting public building", energy use measurements have shown this building to be fairly inefficient in terms of energy use (375 kWh/m^{2}/yr), with a 2012 Display Energy Performance Certificate rating of "E". It has been compared variously to a helmet (either Darth Vader's or simply a motorcyclist's), a misshapen egg, and a woodlouse. Former mayor Ken Livingstone referred to it as a "glass testicle", while his successor, Boris Johnson, made the same comparison using a different word, "The Glass Gonad" and more politely as "The Onion".

A 500-metre (1,600 ft) helical walkway ascends the full ten storeys. At the top is an exhibition and meeting space with an open viewing deck that was occasionally open to the public. The ramp could not be used as intended for security reasons. The walkway provides views of the interior of the building, and is intended to symbolise transparency; a similar device was used by Foster in his design for the rebuilt Reichstag (parliament), when Germany's capital was moved back to Berlin. In 2006 it was announced that photovoltaic cells would be fitted to the building by the London Climate Change Agency.

The debating chamber was located at the bottom of the helical stairway. The seats and desks for assembly members were arranged in a circular form.

== Location ==
The building is located on The Queen's Walk, a part of the extended pedestrianised south-side embankment of the River Thames in the London Borough of Southwark. It forms part of a larger development called More London, including offices and shops. The nearest London Underground and National Rail station is London Bridge.

== In popular culture ==
In 2015, City Hall acted as location for the fictional HQ of the Joint Intelligence Service in the James Bond film Spectre. The building appeared taller, and in a different Thames-side location in the movie through the use of computer-generated imagery. In 2016 the walkways were filled with musicians during Open House London in a site-specific work by British composer Samuel Bordoli, which explored the unique acoustic of the structure. In 2018, the final selection for the television show The Apprentice was filmed in City Hall. It is featured in the Mario Kart games Mario Kart Tour and Mario Kart 8 Deluxe as part of the London Loop racecourse. The 2025 film Mickey 17 was filmed inside City Hall.

== Gallery ==
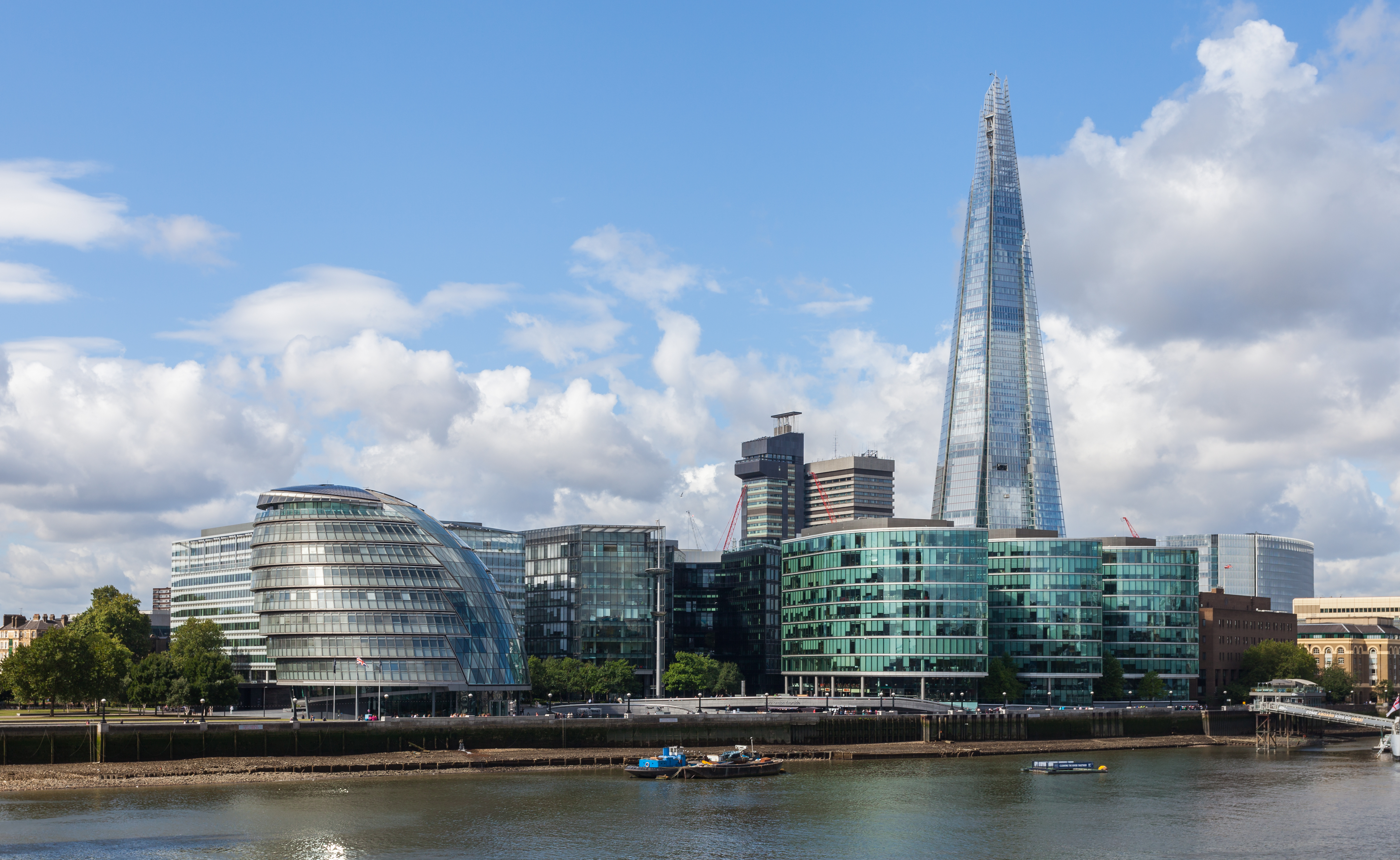
Southwark bank of the River Thames, near Tower Bridge

Tower Bridge and Canary Wharf viewed from the balcony around the top of the building

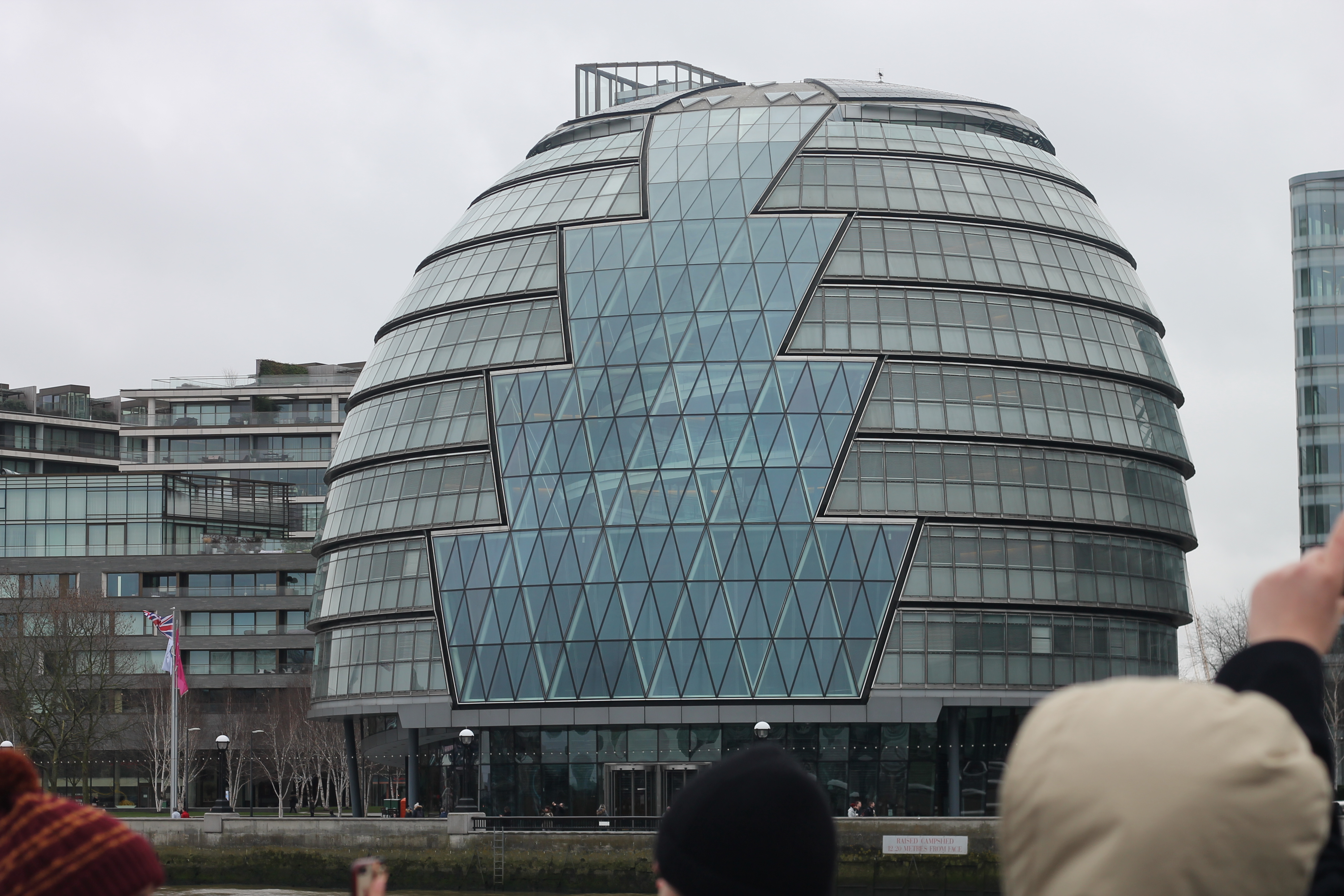
A view of City Hall in London from the River Thames

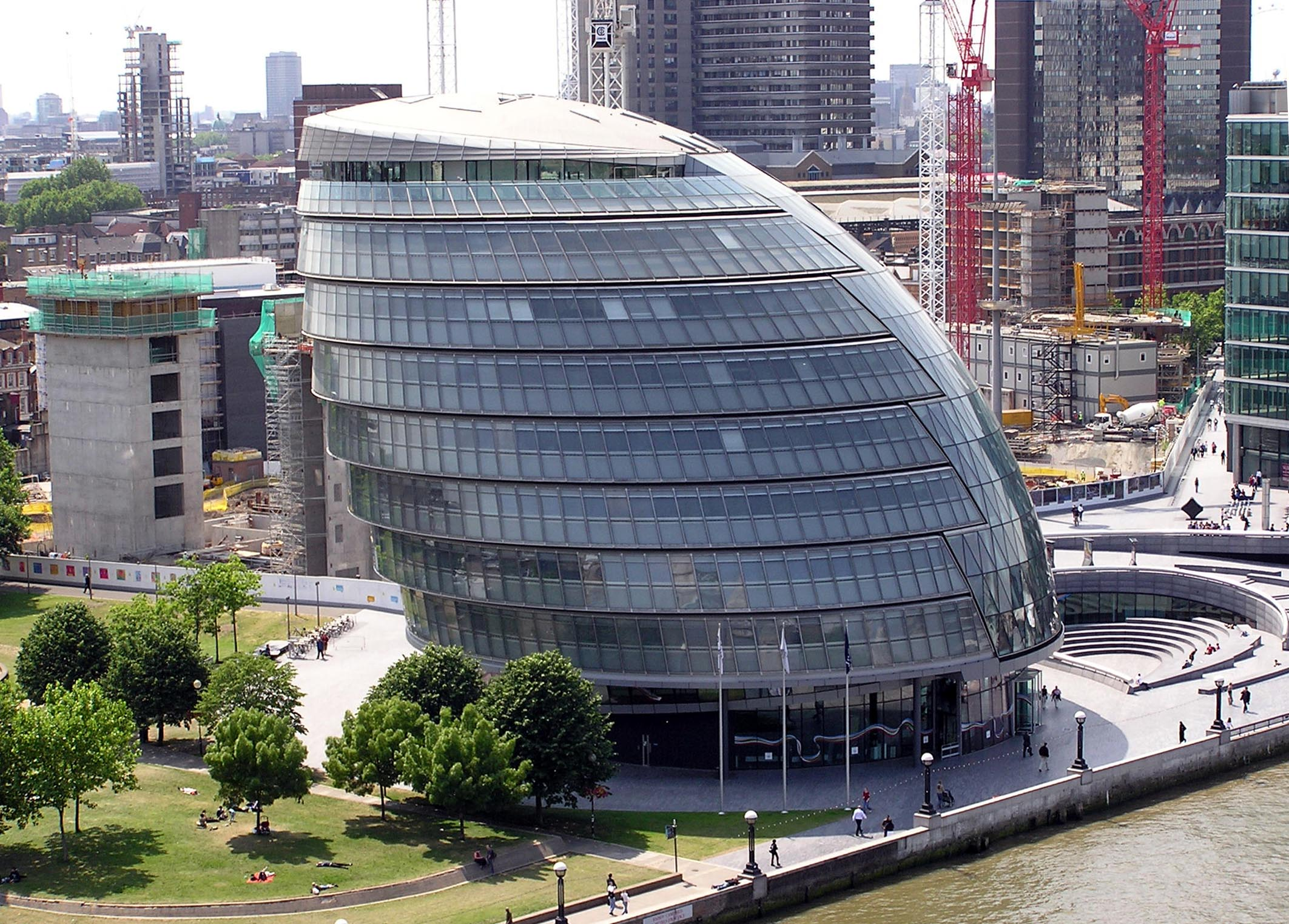
A view from the high walkway of Tower Bridge

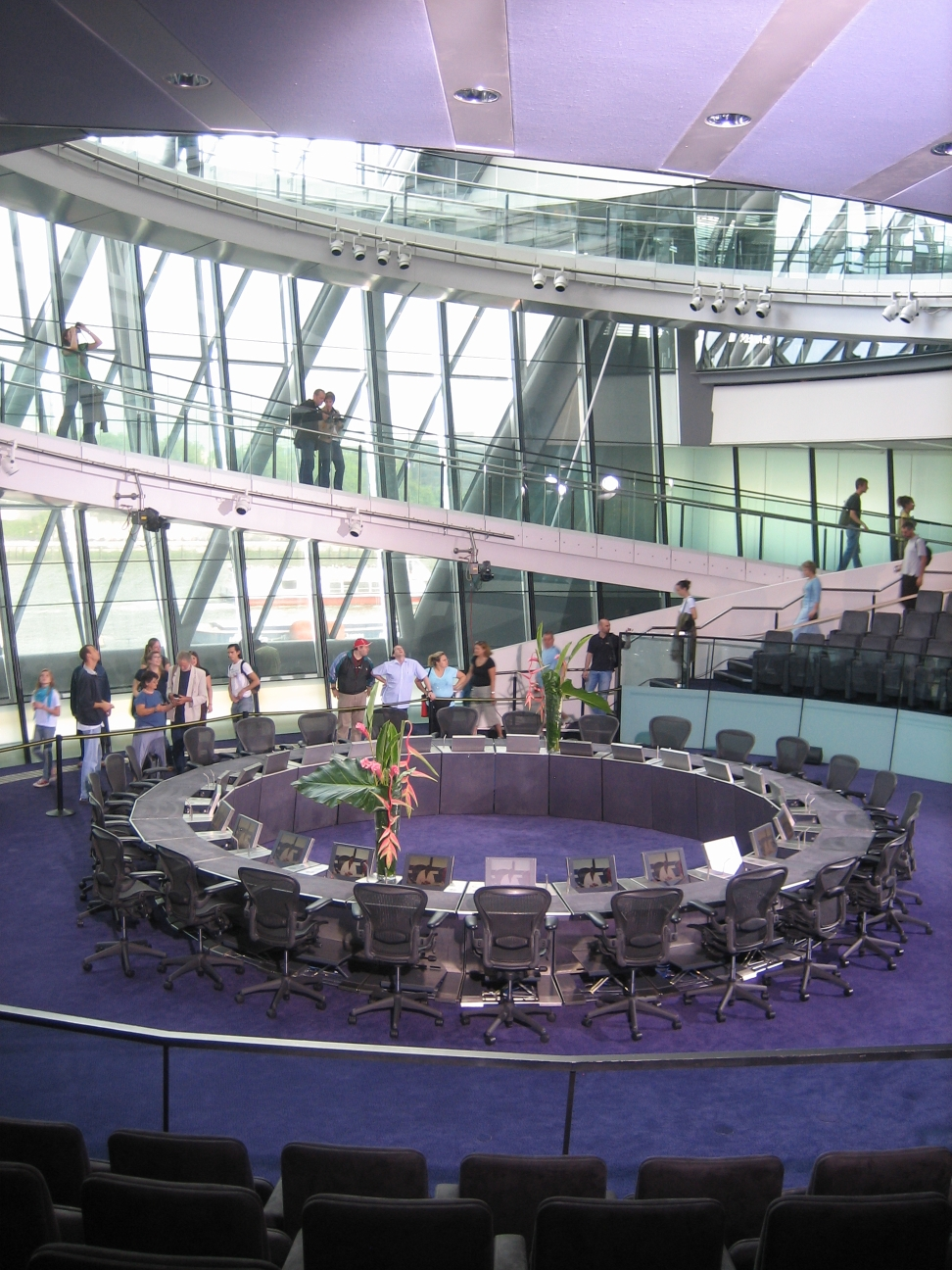
The debating chamber inside the building

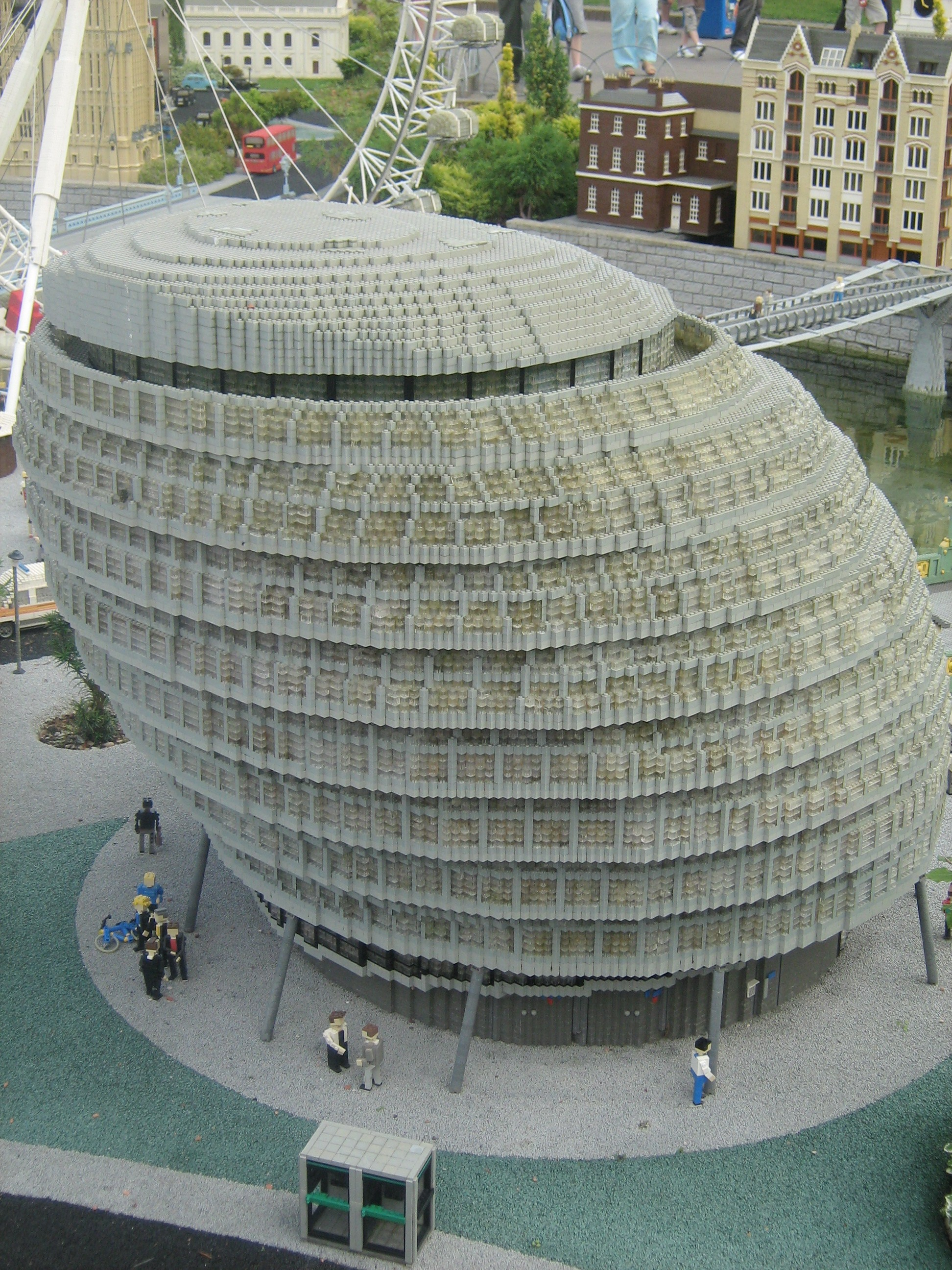
Model of London City Hall in Legoland Windsor

== See also ==
- County Hall
- Inclined building
